Wilson is a common English-language surname.  Notable people with the surname include:

A
A. D. Wilson (1844–1920), American cartographer
A. N. Wilson (born 1950), English writer and newspaper columnist
Aarik Wilson (born 1982), American long jumper and triple jumper
Aaron Wilson (born 1980), Canadian lacrosse player
Aaron Wilson (born 1991), Australian bowls player
 Aaron Wilson, Australian film director and writer
 Aaron Wilson (1589–1643), Anglican clergyman
Abe Wilson (1899–1981), American footballer
Addie Wilson (1876 – 1966) American composer, organist and carillonist
Adine Wilson (born 1979), New Zealand international netball player
Adrian Wilson (disambiguation), one of the following
Adrian Wilson (book designer) (1923–1988), American book designer and printer
Adrian Wilson (actor) (born 1969), South African model and actor
Adrian Wilson (American football) (born 1979), American football player
A'ja Wilson (born 1996), American basketball player
Ajee' Wilson (born 1994), American middle-distance runner
Al Wilson (disambiguation), multiple people, including:
Al Wilson (born 1977), American football player
Alan Wilson (disambiguation), one of the following:
Alan Herries Wilson (1906–1995), British mathematician and business executive
Alan Wilson (cricketer, born 1920) (1920–2015), English cricketer
Alan Wilson (cricketer, born 1936), English cricketer
Alan Wilson (academic) (born 1939), British scientist and social scientist, UCL
Alan Wilson (cricketer, born 1942), English cricketer
Alan Wilson (musician) (1943–1970), aka Alan "Blind Owl" Wilson, American blues singer (Canned Heat)
Alan Wilson (motorsport) (born 1946), American race track designer
Alan Wilson (composer) (born 1947), British composer of church music
Alan Wilson (bishop) (born 1955), Bishop of Buckingham
Alan Wilson (rugby league) (born 1967), Australian rugby league player
Alan Wilson (South Carolina politician) (born 1973), Attorney General of South Carolina
Alastair Wilson (born 1983), British field hockey player
Albert Wilson (disambiguation), one of the following
Albert E. Wilson (died 1861), American pioneer and merchant in Oregon Country
Albert Wilson (botanist) (1902–1996), American botanist and gardener
Albert George Wilson (1918–2002), American astronomer who worked at Palomar Observatory
Albert Wilson (American football) (born 1992), American football player
Alex or Alexander Wilson (disambiguation), several people
Alexandra Wilson (born 1968), American actress
Alf or Alfred Wilson (disambiguation), one of the following
Alf Wilson (English footballer) (1890–after 1919), English footballer
Alfred Wilson (rower) (1903–1989), American Olympic rower
Alfred L. Wilson (1919–1944), United States Army soldier and Medal of Honor recipient in World War II
Alfred M. Wilson (1948–1969), United States Marine and Medal of Honor recipient in the Vietnam War
Alice Wilson (1881–1964), Canadian geologist and paleontologist
Alicia Wilson (footballer) (born 1979), Jamaican footballer
Alistair Wilson (born 1939), British sprint canoeist
Allan and Allen Wilson (disambiguation), one of the following
Allan Wilson (army officer) (1856–1893), British soldier
Allan Wilson (biologist) (1934–1991), New Zealand evolutionary biologist and molecular anthropologist
Allan Wilson (Scottish politician) (born 1954), Labour Member of the Scottish Parliament
Allen B. Wilson (1824–1888), American inventor of the sewing machine shuttle
Allen Wilson (American football) (born 1951/2), American high school football coach
Alpheus Waters Wilson (1834–1916), American bishop of the Methodist Episcopal Church, South
Alyson Wilson (born 1967), American statistician
Amanda Wilson (born 1980), British singer
Amir Wilson (born 2004), British actor
Amy Wilson (artist) (born 1973), American artist
Andrew and Andy Wilson (disambiguation), one of the following
Andrew Wilson (artist) (1780–1848), Scottish landscape-painter
Andrew Wilson (traveller) (1831–1881), Scottish traveller and author
Andrew Wilson (Australian politician) (1844–1906), politician in Queensland, Australia
Andrew Wilson (architect) (1866–1950), West Australian architect
Andrew Wilson (footballer, born 1880) (1880–1945), Scottish footballer
Andrew P. Wilson (1886–after 1947), British director, playwright, teacher, and actor
Andrew Wilson (footballer, born 1896) (1896–1973), Scottish footballer
Andrew Wilson (RAF officer) (born 1941), Royal Air Force commander
Andrew Wilson (academic) (born 1950), American religious scholar
Andrew Wilson (writer) or A. N. Wilson (born 1950), English writer and columnist
Andrew Wilson (cricketer, born 1954), New Zealand cricketer
Andrew Wilson (garden designer) (born 1959), British garden designer, lecturer and writer
Andrew Wilson (presenter) (born 1960), British news presenter and foreign correspondent
Andrew Wilson (historian) (born 1961), British historian
Andrew Wilson (rugby league) (born 1963), English rugby league player
Andrew Wilson (actor) (born 1964), American actor and director
Andrew Wilson (canoer) (born 1964), Australian slalom canoeist
Andrew Wilson (classical archaeologist) (born 1968), British archaeologist
Andrew Wilson (economist) (born 1970), Scottish politician
Andrew Wilson (curler), Scottish curler
Andrew Wilson (businessman) (born 1974), present CEO from Electronic Arts
Andrew Wilson (musician), frontman for New Zealand punk trio Die! Die! Die!
Andy Wilson (cyclist) (1902–1926), British Olympic cyclist
Andy Wilson (cricketer) (1910–2002), English first class cricketer
Andy Wilson (English footballer) (born 1940), English footballer
Andy Wilson (Australian rules footballer) (born 1951), Australian rules footballer
Andy Wilson (director) (born 1958), British film, TV and theatre director
Angela K. Wilson, American chemist
Angus Wilson (1913–1991), British author
Anima Wilson, Ghanaian politician
Anita Wilson (born 1976), American gospel singer-songwriter and producer
Ann Wilson (born 1950), Lead singer for American rock band Heart, sister of Nancy Wilson
Ann-Marie Wilson, British psychologist and FGM activist
Anna Wilson (basketball) (born 1997), American basketball player; sister of American football quarterback Russell Wilson
Anna Wilson (swimmer) (born 1977), United States-born Olympic swimmer from New Zealand
Anne Wilson (poet) (1848–1930), Australian poet
Anne Wilson (artist) (born 1949), American artist
Anthony H. Wilson (1950–2007), record label owner, nicknamed "Mr Manchester"
Antonia Joy Wilson, American conductor
Antonio Wilson (born 1977), American footballer
Ara Wilson, American academic and author
 Sir Archdale Wilson, 1st Baronet (1803–1874), British Indian Army soldier, commanding at the Siege of Bharatpur in 1825–26
Archibald and Archie Wilson (disambiguation), one of the following
Archibald Duncan Wilson (1911–1983), British diplomat and Master of Corpus Christi College, Cambridge
Archibald Wilson (1921–2014), Rhodesian fighter pilot and politician
Archie Wilson (Australian footballer) (1888–1961), Australian rules footballer
Archie F. Wilson (1903–1960), American wood collector
Archie Wilson (baseball) (1923–2007), baseball player
Arnold Wilson (disambiguation), one of the following
Arnold Wilson (1840–1940), British civil commissioner in Baghdad 1918–1920
Arnold Muir Wilson (1857–1909), British solicitor and politician
Arnold Manaaki Wilson (1928–2012), New Zealand artist and educator
Art, Arthur and Artie Wilson (disambiguation) one of the following
Art Wilson (1885–1960), baseball catcher
Arthur Wilson (writer) (1595–1652), English writer
Arthur Wilson (shipping magnate) (1836–1909), English ship-owner from Hull
Arthur Wilson (judge) (1837–1915), English judge
Arthur Wilson (Royal Navy officer) (1842–1921), English Admiral and First Sea Lord
Arthur James Wilson (1858–1945), English cyclist and journalist
Arthur Stanley Wilson (1868–1938), Member of Parliament for Holderness
Arthur Wilson (Western Australian politician) (1869–1948), former Western Australian politician
Arthur H. Wilson (1881–1953), Philippine–American War Medal of Honor recipient
Arthur Wilson (rugby union) (1886–1917), British rugby union player and Olympic medalist
Arthur Wilson (Australian rules footballer) (1888–1947), Australian Rules footballer
Arthur R. Wilson (1894–1956), US General in WW2
Arthur Wilson (cricketer) (1894–1977), English cricketer
Arthur McCandless Wilson (1902–1979), American professor of biography
Arthur Wilson (English footballer) (1908–2000), Southampton, West Ham United and Chester footballer
Arthur Wilson (crystallographer) (1914–1995), Canadian crystallographer (Cambridge and Birmingham)
Arthur A. Wilson (born 1968), Anglo-Indian cinematographer
Artie Wilson (1920–2010), American baseball player
Atoy Wilson (born 1951/52), American figure skater
August Wilson (1945–2005), American playwright
Augusta Jane Evans aka Augusta Jane Wilson (née Evens, 1835–1909), American author (Confederate)
Austin Wilson (born 1992), American basketball player
Avery Wilson (born 1995), American singer-songwriter and dancer
Ayse Wilson, Turkish-American artist

B
B. A. Wilson (born 1971), American NASCAR driver
B. J. Wilson (1947–1990), British rock drummer (Procol Harum)
Barbara Wilson, British psychologist
Barney Wilson (1912–1999), American basketball coach
Barrie Wilson (born 1940), Canadian writer, historian and theologian
Barry Wilson (disambiguation), one of the following
Barry Wilson (Royal Navy officer) (1936–2018), first captain of HMS Cardiff
Barry Wilson (American football) (born 1943), American football coach
Barry Wilson (footballer) (born 1972), Scottish footballer
Bart Wilson, American experimental economist
Bee Wilson (born 1974), British food writer and historian
Behn Wilson (born 1958), Canadian ice hockey defenceman
Ben and Benjamin Wilson (disambiguation), several people
Ben F. Wilson (1876–1930), American actor, director, screenwriter and producer
Ben Wilson (cricketer) (1921–1993), English cricketer
Ben Wilson (American football coach) (1926–1970), American football coach
Ben Wilson, 4th Baron Nunburnholme (1928–1998), British peer
Ben Wilson (fullback) (born 1939), professional American football player
Ben Wilson (English artist) (born 1963), London based artist
Ben Wilson (basketball) (1967–1984), basketball player
Ben Wilson (musician) (born 1967), American musician and keyboardist for the band Blues Traveler
Ben Wilson (Australian footballer) (born 1977), Australian rules footballer
Ben Wilson (motorcycle racer) (born 1982), superbike rider
Ben Wilson (speedway rider) (born 1986), professional speedway rider
Ben Wilson (English footballer) (born 1992), English footballer
Benjamin Wilson (painter) (1721–1788), English painter and scientist
Benjamin Davis Wilson (1811–1878), aka Don Benito Wilson, politician in Southern California
Benjamin Wilson (biblical scholar) (1817–1900), writer; co-founder of the Church of God of the Abrahamic Faith
Benjamin Wilson (congressman) (1825–1901), early member of the U.S. House of Representatives
Benjamin Franklin Wilson (politician) (1851–1937), American politician from the state of Oklahoma
Benjamin B. Wilson (1879–1957), English cricketer
Benjamin F. Wilson (1922–1988), American soldier and Medal of Honor recipient
Benjamin H. Wilson (1925–1988), Pennsylvania politician
Benjamin Wilson (referee) (born 1975), Australian football (soccer) referee
Bernard Wilson (singer) (1946–2010), American R&B, funk and soul music vocalist
Bernard Wilson (American football) (born 1970), American football player
Bert Wilson (broadcaster) (1911–1955), American baseball broadcaster
Bert Wilson (ice hockey) (1949–1992), Canadian ice hockey player
Bertha Wilson (1923–2007), Canadian jurist and first female Puisne Justice of the Supreme Court of Canada
Bertha M. Wilson (1874–1936), American dramatist, critic, actress
Bertram Martin Wilson (1896–1935), English mathematician
Beth Wilson, Australian public servant
Betty Wilson (1921–2010), Australian international cricketer
Betty Wilson (New Jersey politician) (born 1932), American politician in New Jersey
Bev Wilson (born 1949), Australian international cricketer
Bevan Wilson (born 1956), New Zealand rugby union international
Big Daddy Wilson (born 1960), American electric and soul blues singer and songwriter 
Bill and Billy Wilson (disambiguation), multiple people
Bill Wilson (catcher) (1867–1924), American baseball catcher
Bill Wilson (convict) (1880–?), convicted of murdering two individuals who were later found alive
Bill W. (William Griffith Wilson, 1895–1971), American; co-founder of Alcoholics Anonymous
Bill Wilson (footballer) (1924–1969), Australian rules footballer
Bill Wilson (outfielder) (1928–2017), American baseball outfielder
Bill Wilson (pitcher) (1942–1993), American Major League Baseball (MLB) pitcher
Bill Wilson (pastor) (born 1948), American; president and founder of Metro Ministries International
Bill Wilson (activist) (born 1953), Washington-based activist
Bill Wilson (Montana politician) (born 1961), Montana State Representative
Bill Wilson (Scottish politician) (William L. Wilson, born 1963), Scottish nationalist
Bill Wilson (judge), New Zealand judge of the Supreme Court and Court of Appeal
Billy Wilson (outlaw) (1862–1918), American outlaw who rode with Billy the Kid
Billy Wilson (New Zealand rugby league), New Zealand rugby league footballer who played in the 1910s, and 1920s
Billy Wilson (American soccer) (fl. 1920s–1930s), American soccer player
Billy Wilson (Australian rugby league) (1927–1993), Australian rugby league footballer
Billy Wilson (wide receiver) (1927–2009), NFL wide receiver
Billy Wilson (footballer, born 1936), Northern Irish football player for Burnley
Billy Roy Wilson (William Roy Wilson, Jr., born 1939), United States federal judge
Billy Wilson (footballer, born 1946) (1946–2018), English footballer
Billy Wilson (academic) (born 1959), theologian affiliated with Oral Roberts University
Blaine Wilson (born 1974), American Olympic gymnast
Blair Wilson (born 1963), Canadian Member of Parliament
Blake S. Wilson (born 1948), an American research scientist
Blayne Wilson (born 1992), Australian rules footballer
Blythe Wilson, Canadian stage actress
Bob and Bobby Wilson (disambiguation), multiple people
Bob Wilson (footballer, born 1867), Irish international footballer of the 1880s
Bob Wilson (footballer, born August 1898) (1898–1986), Australian rules footballer — played for Carlton
Bob Wilson (footballer, born September 1898)  1920s, Scottish footballer with Third Lanark and Fall River Marksmen (USA)
Bob Wilson (American football) (1913–1999), American football player
Bob Wilson (U.S. politician) (1916–1999), U.S. Representative from California
Bob Wilson (baseball) (1925–1985), played for the 1958 L.A. Dodgers
Bob Wilson (basketball) (1926–2014), American professional basketball player
Bob Wilson (cricketer) (born 1928), English cricketer
Bob Wilson (footballer, born 1928) (1928–2006), English footballer for Preston North End and Tranmere Rovers
Bob Wilson (sportscaster) (1929–2015), radio sportscaster for the Boston Bruins
Bob Wilson (New Zealand footballer) (fl.1948), New Zealand international football (soccer) player
Bob Wilson (footballer, born 1934), Scottish footballer for Norwich City and Gillingham
Bob Wilson (ice hockey) (1934–2020), Canadian ice hockey player
Bob Wilson (economist) (born 1937), American economist and professor at Stanford University
Bob Wilson (singer) (born c. 1940), Californian singer-guitarist, first to record "(And Her Name Is) Scarlet"
Bob Wilson (footballer, born 1941), Scottish international; goalkeeper for Arsenal; later a broadcaster
Bob Wilson (cartoonist) (born 1942), British cartoonist of the Stanley Bagshaw children's cartoons
Bob Wilson (footballer, born 1943), English football goalkeeper
Bob Wilson (footballer, born 1945) (born 1945), Australian rules footballer, played for Essendon
Bobby Wilson (tennis) (1935–2020), British tennis player of the 1950s and 1960s
Bobby Wilson (footballer, born 1943) (born 1943), Scottish footballer (Dundee FC)
Bobby Wilson (basketball, born 1944), American professional basketball player in the ABA
Bobby Wilson (footballer, born 1944), English footballer
Bobby Wilson (basketball, born 1951), American professional basketball player in the NBA
Bobby Wilson (defensive tackle) (born 1968), American football player
Bobby Wilson (racing driver) (born 1981), American racecar driver
Bobby Wilson (baseball) (born 1983), American baseball player
Bobo Wilson (born 1995), American football player
Boyd Wilson (born 1959), Australian singer-songwriter, musician and producer
Brad Wilson (disambiguation), multiple people
Brad Wilson (soccer) (born 1972), American soccer midfielder
Brad Wilson (cricketer) (born 1985), New Zealand cricketer
Brad Wilson (politician) American politician of the Utah House of Representatives
Braden Wilson (born 1989), American footballer
Brandon Wilson (born 1953), American explorer and travel writer
Bradley Wilson (freestyle skier) (born 1992), American freestyle skier
Brandon Wilson (American football) (born 1994), American football player
Brenard Wilson (born 1955), American football safety
Brenda Wilson, Lieutenant–Governor of South Australia
Brent Wilson (rugby union) (born 1981), New Zealand rugby union footballer
Brent Wilson (musician), American bassist
Brett Wilson (disambiguation), several people
Brian Wilson (disambiguation), several people
Brian Wilson (systems scientist) (born 1933), British academic, co-developer of SSM
Brian Wilson (born 1942), American musician and founding member of The Beach Boys
Brian Wilson (Northern Ireland politician) (born 1943), Green Party politician in Northern Ireland
Brian Wilson (Labour politician) (born 1948), British Labour Party politician
Brian Wilson (news correspondent) (born 1956), Washington D.C. bureau chief and v.p. of Fox News Channel
Brian Wilson (footballer, born 1957), English footballer (Newcastle United FC)
Brian Anthony Wilson (born 1960), American film and television actor
Brian Wilson (Australian rules footballer) (born 1961), Brownlow Medal winner 1982
Brian Wilson (poker player) (born 1967), bracelet winner at the 2005 World Series of Poker
Brian Wilson (baseball) (born 1982), Major League Baseball pitcher
Brian Wilson (tennis) (born 1982), world tour American tennis player
Brian Wilson (footballer, born 1983), English footballer with Oldham Athletic A.F.C.
Brian Courtney Wilson, American gospel and CCM singer
Bridgette Wilson (later known as Bridgette Wilson-Sampras) (born 1973), American actress and model
Brooks Wilson, American baseball player
Bruce Wilson (disambiguation), several people
Bruce Wilson (Australian journalist) (1941–2006), Australian sports journalist who mainly worked in England
Bruce Wilson (bishop) (1942–2021), Australian Anglican Bishop of Bathurst
Bruce Wilson (soccer) (born 1951), Canadian soccer player and coach
Bryan R. Wilson (1926–2004), English sociologist
Bryce Wilson (born 1972), Jamaican record producer
Bryon Wilson (born 1988), American Olympic skier
Bryse Wilson (born 1997), American baseball player
Bubba Wilson (born 1955), American basketball player
Budge Wilson (1927–2021), Canadian author
Burt Wilson (1933–2021),  American philosopher, writer, broadcaster, jazz musician, and political activist
Butch Wilson (born 1941), American footballer
Butler R. Wilson (1861–1939), Boston civil rights activist

C
C. Anne Wilson, British food historian
C. J. Wilson (disambiguation), several people
C. J. Wilson (born 1980), American baseball player
C. J. Wilson (safety) (born 1985), American football safety
C. J. Wilson (defensive end) (born 1987), American football defensive end
C. J. Wilson (cornerback) (born 1989), American football cornerback
C. T. Wilson (born 1972), American politician in Maryland
Cairine Wilson (1885–1962), Canada's first female senator
Cal Wilson (born 1970), New Zealand comedian and radio and TV personality
Caleb Wilson (born 1996), American football player
Callum Wilson (Australian footballer) (born 1989), Australian rules footballer
Callum Wilson (English footballer) (born 1992), English footballer
Camille Wilson (born 1995), American-born Filipino international footballer
Campbell Wilson (born 1971), New Zealand airline executive
Carey Wilson (writer) (1889–1962), American screenwriter, voice actor, and producer
Carey Wilson (ice hockey) (born 1962), Canadian ice hockey centre
Carin Wilson (born 1945), New Zealand sculptor
Carl Wilson (1946–1998), American musician, co-founder of the Beach Boys
Carl Wilson (critic), Canadian cultural critic
Carl Wilson (politician) (born 1955), American state-level politician (Oregon)
Carly Wilson (born 1982), Australian basketball player
Carnie Wilson (born 1968), American singer (Wilson Phillips) and TV host; daughter of Brian Wilson
Carol Wilson, American operatic soprano
Caroline Wilson (born 1960), Australian sports journalist
Caroline Wilson (diplomat) (born 1970), British diplomat
Carolyn Wilson (born 1959), British Olympic synchronised swimmer
Casey Wilson (born 1980), American actress, comedian and screenwriter
Cassandra Wilson (born 1955), American jazz musician, singer-songwriter and producer
Catherine Wilson (1822–1862), British; convicted murderer
Cecil Wilson (Bishop of Bunbury) (1860–1941), Anglican Bishop of Melanesia
Cecil Wilson (politician) (1862–1945), British pacifist Labour Party Member of Parliament
Cecil Wilson (bishop of Middleton) (1875–1937), Anglican Bishop of Middleton
Cedric Wilson (born 1948), Northern Irish politician
Cedrick Wilson Sr. (born 1978), US American footballer
Cedrick Wilson Jr. (born 1995), son of the previous and US American footballer
Chandra Wilson (born 1969), American actress
Charles Wilson (disambiguation), one of the following
Charles Wilson (Quebec politician) (1808–1877), Legislative Council of Quebec, Canadian Senator
Charles Heath Wilson (1809–1882), Anglo-Scottish painter, art teacher and author
Charles Wilson (Scottish architect) (1810–1861), Scottish architect
Charles Rivers Wilson (1831–1916), British civil servant and financier
Charles Wilson, 1st Baron Nunburnholme (1833–1907), English shipowner, Liberal Member of Parliament (MP)
Charles Wilson (sailor) (1836–?), Union Navy sailor during the American Civil War
Charles William Wilson (1836–1905), British geographer and major general
Charles Wilson (British Columbia politician) (1841–1924), first leader of the B.C. Conservative Party
Charles Burnett Wilson (1850–1926), Marshal of the Kingdom of Hawaii
Charles Wilson (librarian) (1857–1932), Member of Parliament and parliamentary librarian
Charles Henry Wilson (Conservative politician) (1859–1930), UK politician — Leeds Central
Charles Plumpton Wilson (1859–1938), England footballer
Charles Branch Wilson (1861–1941), American marine biologist
Charles Wilson (New Zealand Reform Party politician) (1862–1934), Member of Parliament
Charles Robert Wilson (1863–1904), English academic and historian of British India
Charles Coker Wilson (1864–1933), American architect
Charles Wilson (fencer) (1865–1950), British Olympic fencer
Charles Wilson (cricketer) (1869–1952), Australian cricketer who played mainly in New Zealand
Charles Thomson Rees Wilson (1869–1959), Scottish physicist awarded the Nobel Prize
Charles Edward Wilson (rugby player and soldier) (1871–1914), British military officer and rugby union player
Charles Wilson, 2nd Baron Nunburnholme (1875–1924), Liberal MP for Hull West, son of the 1st Baron
Charles Wilson, 1st Baron Moran (1882–1977), British physician
Charles Edward Wilson (General Electric executive) (1886–1972), CEO of GE and member of the Truman Administration
Charles Erwin Wilson (1890–1961), United States Secretary of Defense (1953–1957) and head of General Motors
Charles C. Wilson (actor) (1894–1948), American film actor
Charles Wilson (political scientist) (1909–2002), Scottish political scientist and university administrator
 Charles Kemmons Wilson (1913–2003), founder of the Holiday Inn chain of hotels
Charles Wilson (historian) (1914–1991), English business historian and Cambridge University professor
Malcolm Wilson (governor) (Charles) Malcolm Wilson (1914–2000), Governor of New York
Charles H. Wilson (1917–1984), U.S. Congressman from California and State Assemblyman
Charles Banks Wilson (1918–2013), American artist
Charles Wilson (composer) (1931–2019), Canadian composer and choral conductor
Charles Wilson (rugby player) (1931–2016), Australian rugby union player and manager
Charles Wilson (journalist) (1935–2022), Scottish-born newspaper editor
Charles R. Wilson (judge) (born 1954), U.S. Court of Appeals judge
Charles Wilson (American football) (born 1968), National Football League wide receiver
Charles Richard 'Ricky' Wilson) (born 1978), lead singer of Kaiser Chiefs and judge on The Voice
Charlie Wilson (footballer, born 1877) (1877–?), played for Liverpool and Stockport County
Charlie Wilson (footballer, born 1895) (1895–1971), played for Spurs, Huddersfield Town and Stoke City
Charlie Wilson (baseball) (1905–1970), Major League Baseball player
Charlie Wilson (footballer, born 1905) (1905–1985), played for West Bromwich Albion, Sheffield Wednesday
Charlie Wilson (criminal) (1932–1990), English career criminal, one of the Great Train Robbery gang
Charlie Wilson (Texas politician) (1933–2010), U.S. Congressman from Texas, then State Senator
Charlie Wilson (Ohio politician) (1943–2013), U.S. Congressman, then State Senator
Charlie Wilson (singer) (born 1953), American R&B singer, songwriter, and producer
Che Wilson (born 1979), English footballer
Cheryl Wilson, American session singer
Chesley Goseyun Wilson (1932–2021), American maker and player of the Apache fiddle
Chip Wilson (born 1956), Canadian businessman
Chris Wilson (disambiguation), one of several people, including:
Chris Wilson (guitarist) (born 1952), UK-based US-born musician
Chris Wilson (blues musician) (1956–2019), Australian blues musician
Chris Wilson (fighter) (born 1977), American mixed martial arts fighter
Chris Wilson (Canadian politician)
Chris Wilson (gridiron football) (born 1982), American football defensive end
Chris Wilson (golfer) (born 1984), American professional golfer
Christine Wilson (disambiguation), several people
Christopher Wilson (disambiguation), several people
Christopher Wilson (father) (1731–1804), English merchant and banker in Kendal
Christopher Wilson (son) (1765–1845), English businessman, banker and political activist
Christopher Wilson (lutenist) (born 1951), British lutenist
Christopher Wilson (British Army officer) (retired 2010), British Major-General
Chuck Wilson (disambiguation), several people
Chuck Wilson (jazz musician) (1948–2018), American jazz musician
Chuck Wilson (sports journalist) (born 1954), regular host of GameNight on ESPN Radio
Chuck Wilson (athlete) (born 1968), American sprinter
Chuck Wilson (multimedia executive) (born 1968), multimedia executive
Cindy Wilson (born 1957), American singer-songwriter (B-52s)
Cintra Wilson (born 1967), American writer, performer and cultural critic
Claggett Wilson, (1887–1952) American painter
Clay Wilson (born 1983), American ice hockey player
Clement Wilson (athlete) (1891–1983), American sprint athlete
Clement Wilson (writer) (born 1976), Irish journalist, author and travel writer
 Clerow Wilson Jr. (1933–1998), known as Flip Wilson, American comedian and actor
Cliff Wilson (1934–1994), Welsh snooker player
Clifford Wilson (disambiguation), several people
Clive Wilson (born 1961), English footballer
Clyde Wilson (disambiguation), several people
Clyde Tabor Wilson (1889–1971), British politician
Clyde Carol Wilson (1910–1990), American singer, songwriter, bandleader, and radio and TV personality
Clyde A. Wilson (1923–2008), American detective and private investigator
Clyde N. Wilson (born 1941), American professor of history, political commentator, writer and editor
Clyde Wilson (cyclist) (born 1959), Bermudian Olympic cyclist
Cody Wilson (born 1988), American 2nd amendment advocate
Colin Wilson (disambiguation), several people
Colin James Wilson (1922–1993), New Zealand musician, singer, songwriter and railway worker
Colin St John Wilson (1922–2007), British architect, lecturer and author
Colin Wilson (1931–2013), British writer
Colin Wilson (Australian footballer) (born 1933), Australian rules footballer
Colin Wilson (comics) (born 1949), comic book artist
Colin Wilson (film producer), American film producer
Colin Wilson (rugby league) (born 1969), rugby league footballer for Scotland, and Linlithgow Lions
Colin Wilson (ice hockey) (born 1989), American ice hockey player
Colin Wilson (Scottish footballer) (born 1993), Scottish footballer
Constance K. Wilson (born 1959), American politician in North Carolina
Corey Wilson (born 1985), American military veteran and politician in Maine
Cornelius Wilson (born 1952), Anglican bishop of Costa Rica
Cornell A. Wilson, Jr., US Marine Corps major general
Corri Wilson (born 1965), Scottish Member of Parliament
Cosmo Wilson (born 1961), American concert lighting designer and director
Craig Wilson (disambiguation), several people
Craig Wilson (water polo) (born 1957), water polo player
Craig Wilson (third baseman, born 1964), MLB third baseman
Craig Wilson (third baseman, born 1970), MLB third baseman
Craig Wilson (curler) (born 1973), Scottish curler
Craig Wilson (first baseman) (born 1976), Major League Baseball (MLB) outfielder/first baseman
Craig Wilson (footballer) (born 1986), Scottish footballer
Craig Wilson (columnist), writer of USA Today column "The Final Word"
Crawford Wilson (born 1990), American actor and voice actor
Cully Wilson (1892–1962), Canadian ice hockey player

D
D. Harlan Wilson (born 1971), American short-story writer, literary critic, editor and novelist
D. W. Wilson (born 1985), Canadian author
Dale Wilson (politician) (born 1953), Australian politician
Dale Wilson (actor) (born 1950), Canadian voice actor
Damian Wilson (born 1969), English prog rock singer
Damien Wilson (born 1993), American football linebacker
Damon Wilson (born c.1974), American foreign policy advisor
Dan Wilson (disambiguation), multiple people
Dan Wilson (musician) (born 1961), American guitarist, vocalist, and songwriter (Semisonic)
Dan Wilson (catcher) (born 1969), American baseball catcher
Dan Wilson (playwright) (born 1970), American playwright, director and actor
Dana Wilson (born 1946), American composer and jazz pianist
Dana Wilson (rugby league) (1983–2011), New Zealand-born Cook Islands rugby league international
Daniel, Danny and Dany Wilson (disambiguation), multiple people
Daniel Wilson (MP) (1680–1754), member of parliament for Westmorland constituency
Daniel Wilson (bishop) (1778–1858), bishop of Calcutta
Daniel Wilson (academic) (1816–1892), British-Canadian archaeologist, ethnologist and author
Daniel Martin Wilson (1862–1932), Irish politician and judge
Daniel H. Wilson (born 1978), American writer and robotics engineer
Daniel Wilson (musician) (born 1991), American singer, songwriter and producer
Danny Wilson (rugby) (born 1955), Welsh rugby league player and father of Ryan Giggs
Danny Wilson (footballer, born 1960), English-born Northern Irish footballer and manager
Danny Wilson (cricketer) (born 1977), English cricketer
Danny Wilson (footballer, born 1991), Scottish footballer
Dany Wilson (1982–2011), Jamaican beach volleyball and volleyball player
Darleen Wilson, American folk musician and record producer
Darnell Wilson (middleweight boxer) (born 1966), American boxer
Darnell Wilson (born 1974), American boxer
Darrell Wilson (born 1958), American football coach
Darren Wilson (disambiguation), multiple people
Darren Wilson (musician) (born 1986), drummer of The Hush Sound, an American indie rock band
Darren Wilson (umpire) (born 1974), Australian rules football boundary umpire
Darroll Wilson (born 1966), American boxer
Dave, David and Davie Wilson (disambiguation), multiple people
Dave Wilson (director) (1933–2002), American television director
Dave Wilson (footballer, born 1942), English footballer who played for Preston and Liverpool
Dave Wilson (footballer, born 1944), English footballer who played for Nottingham Forest
Dave Wilson (American football) (born 1959), American football quarterback
Dave Wilson (swimmer) (born 1960), American swimmer & silver medalist at the 1984 Olympics
Dave Wilson (Nova Scotia politician) (born 1970), Canadian politician and member of the Nova Scotia House of Assembly
Dave Wilson (rugby league) (born 1984), British rugby league footballer
Dave Wilson (rugby union) (born 1985), English rugby union footballer
Dave Wilson (radio personality), American radio personality based in Indianapolis
David Wilson (Calcutta) (1808–1880), hotelier
David H. Wilson (politician) (1855–1926), politician in Manitoba, Canada
Sir David Wilson, 1st Baronet (1855–1930), Scottish landowner and agriculturalist
David Wilson (Manitoba politician) (1858–1927), Irish-born politician in Manitoba, Canada
David Wilson (Dean of St Patrick's Cathedral, Dublin) (1871–1957), Dean of St Patrick's Cathedral, Dublin
David A. Wilson (1875–?), footballer who played for Liverpool FC
David Wilson (barrister) (1879–1965), Australian barrister
David Wilson (New Zealand politician) (1880–1977), New Zealand politician and diplomat
Soldier Wilson (David) Soldier Wilson (1883–1906), English footballer who played for Leeds City
David Wilson (Queen's Park footballer) (1880–1926), Scottish footballer
David Wilson (footballer, born 1884) (1884–?), Scotland international footballer, and football manager
David John Wilson (1887–1976), Judge of the United States Customs Court
David Wilson (footballer, born c. 1908) (1908–1992), English footballer
David Gordon Wilson (1928–2019), British-born American professor of engineering
 Sir David M. Wilson (born 1931), British archaeologist and Director of the British Museum
David Wilson, Baron Wilson of Tillyorn (born 1935), Governor of Hong Kong
David Henry Wilson (born 1937), English writer
David Wilson (violinist) (born 1945), American violinist
 David Wilson (born 1948), birth name of Scottish stage and television actor David Rintoul
David Wilson (Royal Marines officer) (born 1949), Royal Marine general
David Sloan Wilson (born 1949), American evolutionary biologist
David Wilson (Canadian politician) (born 1955), Canadian politician, Nova Scotia House of Assembly
David Wilson (criminologist) (born 1957), British criminologist
David Niall Wilson (born 1959), American writer of horror, science fiction and fantasy fiction
David Wilson (cricketer, born 1966) (born 1966), English cricketer
David Wilson (figure skater) (born 1966), Canadian figure skating choreographer
David Wilson (rugby union, born 1967), Australian rugby union footballer
David Wilson (footballer, born 1969), English football player and manager
David Wilson (murderer) (died 1998), executed Saint Kitts and Nevis criminal
David Wilson (American football) (born 1991), American football running back
David Wilson (footballer, born 1994), Scottish footballer who plays for Partick Thistle
David Hildebrand Wilson, founder of the Museum of Jurassic Technology
David C. Wilson (screenwriter), American screenwriter
Davie Wilson (1939–2022), Scottish footballer, played for Rangers, Dundee United, Dumbarton, Kilmarnock
Dean Wilson (born 1969), American golfer
Debbie Wilson (cricketer) (born 1961), Australian cricketer
Debra Wilson (born 1962), American actress and comedian
Dede Wilson (born 1937), American poet and writer
Demetrius Wilson (born 1990/91), American footballer
Demond Wilson (born 1946), American actor, author and pastor
Denis Wilson (footballer) (born 1936), English footballer
Dennis Wilson (disambiguation), multiple people
Dennis Wilson (composer) (1920–1989), British composer of television scores
Dennis Wilson (poet) (1921–2022), British poet of World War II
Dennis Main Wilson (1924–1997), British television and radio producer
Dennis Wilson (1944–1983), American rock and roll musician (The Beach Boys)
Derek Wilson (architect) (1922–2016), New Zealand architect
Derek Wilson (basketball) (born 1967), American basketball player
De'Runnya Wilson (1994–2020), American football wide receiver
Des Wilson (born 1941), New Zealand born British activist, sports administrator, author and poker player
Desi Wilson (born 1969), American baseball player and coach
Desiré Wilson (born 1953), South African racing driver
Diane Wilson, American environmental campaigner and author
Diarmuid Wilson (born 1965), Irish Fianna Fáil politician and member of Seanad Éireann
Dick Wilson (golf course architect) (1904–1965), American golf course architect
Dick Wilson (musician) (1911–1941), American saxophonist
Dick Wilson (1916–2007), British-born Canadian character actor
Dick Wilson (tribal chairman) (1934–1990), president of the Oglala Sioux Tribe 1972–1976
No I.D. aka Dion Wilson (born 1971), American hip-hop rapper/producer
Dolores Wilson (1928–2010), American opera singer and musical theatre actress
Dolores Wilson (baseball) (1928–2022), All-American Girls Professional Baseball League player
Don and Donald Wilson (disambiguation), multiple people
Don Wilson (announcer) (1900–1982), American announcer and occasional actor in radio and television
Don Wilson (Australian footballer) (1914–2015), Australian footballer
Don Wilson (footballer, born 1930) (1930–2003), English football player and manager, played for Bury FC
Don Wilson (cricketer) (1937–2012), English cricketer
Don W. Wilson (born 1942), Archivist of the United States
Don Wilson (baseball) (1945–1975), Major League Baseball player for the Houston Astros
Don M. Wilson III (born 1948), American banker and risk management specialist
Don Wilson (pastor) (born 1949), founder and senior pastor of Christ's Church of the Valley in Peoria
Don "The Dragon" Wilson (born 1954), actor and kickboxer
Don Wilson (Canadian football) (born 1961), gridiron football defensive back
Donald Wilson (general) (1892–1978), United States Army Air Forces general during World War II
Donald Wilson (writer and producer) (1910–2002), British television writer and producer
Donald Erwin Wilson (1932–2002), U.S. Navy admiral
Donald Roller Wilson (born 1938), American artist
Donald Wilson (cyclist) (born 1944), Australian cyclist
Donna Wilson, American educational and school psychologist
Donovan Wilson (American football) (born 1995), American football player
Dooley Wilson (Arthur Wilson, 1886–1953), American actor and singer
Dorian Wilson (born 1964), American conductor and musical director
Doric Wilson (1939–2011), American playwright, director and producer
Dorien Wilson (born 1963), American actor
Doug Wilson (disambiguation), multiple people
Doug Wilson (athlete) (1920–2010), British athlete
Doug Wilson (ice hockey) (born 1957), retired professional hockey player
Doug Wilson (racing driver), American NASCAR Cup Series driver
Dougal Wilson (born 1971), English director of commercials and music videos
Dougie and Douglas Wilson (disambiguation), multiple people
Dougie Wilson (born 1994), Northern Irish footballer
Douglas Wilson (bishop) (1903–1980), Anglican bishop in the Caribbean
Douglas L. Wilson (born 1935), professor and co-director of Lincoln Studies Center at Knox College
Douglas Wilson (activist) (1950–1992), gay activist from Canada
Douglas Wilson (theologian) (born 1953), Christian pastor and author
Douglas Wilson (interior designer), American designer on the television program Trading Spaces
Drusilla Wilson (1815–1908), American temperance leader and Quaker pastor
Duane Wilson (American football), American football coach
Duane Wilson (1934–2021), American baseball player
Duff Wilson (born 1950s), American investigative reporter
Dunc Wilson (born 1948), Canadian ice hockey goaltender

E
 E. J. Wilson (born 1960), American author
E. J. Wilson (born 1987), American footballer
E. O. Wilson Edward Osborne Wilson (1929–2021), American biologist, researcher, theorist, naturalist and author
Earl Wilson (disambiguation), multiple people
Earl Wilson (politician) (1906–1990), U.S. Representative from Indiana
Earl Wilson (columnist) (1907–1987), U.S. journalist
Earl Wilson (baseball) (1934–2005), U.S. baseball pitcher
Earl Wilson (gridiron football) (born 1958), US American and Canadian footballer
Earnest Wilson, American football coach
Ed and Eddie Wilson (disambiguation), multiple people
Ed Wilson (artist) (1925–1996), African American sculptor
Ed Wilson (singer) (1945–2010), Brazilian singer-songwriter
Ed Wilson, television executive
Eddie Wilson (baseball) (1909–1979), Major League Baseball outfielder in the 1930s
Eddie Wilson (American football) (born 1940), American Football League quarterback in the 1960s
Eddy Wilson (American football) (born 1997), American football player
Edith Bolling Galt Wilson (1872–1961), second wife of Woodrow Wilson
Edith Wilson (singer) (1896–1981), American blues singer and vaudeville performer
Edmund Wilson (1895–1972), American writer and literary critic
Edmund Wilson, Sr. (1863–1923), American lawyer who served as the Attorney General of New Jersey
Edmund Beecher Wilson (1856–1939), American zoologist and geneticist
Edward Wilson (disambiguation), multiple people
Edward Wilson (MP) (c. 1719–1764), English MP for Westmorland
Edward Wilson (journalist) (1813–1878), 19th-century Australian journalist
Edward Wilson (engineer) (1820–1877), engineer and architect in Worcester, England
Edward Livingston Wilson (1838–1903), American photographer, writer and publisher
Edward E. Wilson (1867–1952), African American lawyer
Edward Adrian Wilson (1872–1912), English Antarctic explorer
Edward L. Wilson (born 1931), American civil engineer and academic
Edward Wilson (actor) (1947–2008), English actor and theatre director
Edward Junior Wilson (born 1984), Liberian footballer
Edward Wilson (novelist), 21st-century British writer of spy novels
Edwin Bidwell Wilson (1879–1964), American mathematician and polymath
Edwin Osbourne Wilson (born 1943), American; founder of Armadillo World Headquarters
Effingham Wilson (1785–1868), radical publisher and bookseller
Eleanor Wilson McAdoo (1889-1967), third daughter of Woodrow Wilson
Elder Roma Wilson (1910–2018), American gospel harmonica player and singer
Electo Wilson (born 1989), Hungarian footballer
Elinor Wilson, Canadian civil servant, President of Assisted Human Reproduction Canada
Ella B. Ensor Wilson (1838-1913), American social reformer and writer 
Ellen Axson Wilson (1860–1914), first wife of Woodrow Wilson, former First Lady of the United States
Ellen Wilson (judoka) (born 1976), American judoka
Elliot Wilson (born 1979), English cricketer
Elliott Wilson (cricketer) (born 1976), English cricketer
Elliott Wilson (journalist) (born 1971), American journalist, television producer and magazine editor
Ellis Wilson (1899–1977), American artist
Elizabeth (Harriot) Wilson (c.1762–1786), American hanged for murder in Pennsylvania
Elizabeth Wilson (1921–2015), American actress
Emily Wilson (disambiguation), multiple people
Emma Wilson (born 1967), British academic and writer
Emma Wilson (sailor) (born 1999), British sailor
Emma-Jayne Wilson (born 1981), Canadian jockey
Emperatriz Wilson (born 1966), Cuban long-distance runner
Enrique Wilson (born 1973), baseball player from the Dominican Republic
Ephraim King Wilson (1771–1834), American politician
Ephraim King Wilson II (1821–1891), American politician
Eric Wilson (disambiguation), multiple people
 Erasmus Wilson (1809–1884), English physician and surgeon, see William James Erasmus Wilson
Eric Wilson (athlete) (1900–1985), American athlete
Eric Charles Twelves Wilson (1912–2008), English recipient of the Victoria Cross
Eric Wilson (author) (born 1940), Canadian author
Eric Wilson (linebacker, born 1962) (born 1962), US American football player
Eric Wilson (linebacker, born 1994) (born 1994), US American football player
Eric Wilson (bassist) (born 1970), member of Sublime
Eric Wilson (Canadian football) (born 1978), defensive tackle for the Montreal Alouettes
Eric Wilson (keyboardist), member of Wild Cub
Erica Wilson (1928–2011), English–born American embroidery designer
Erin Cressida Wilson (born 1964), American playwright, screenwriter and author
Ernest and Ernie Wilson (disambiguation), multiple people
Ernest Henry Wilson (1876–1930), English botanist and explorer
Ernest J. Wilson III (born c.1948), U.S. academic and research scholar
Ernest Wilson (singer), Jamaican reggae singer
 Ernest Wilson, American hip hop and R&B producer known as No I.D.
Ernie Wilson (1900–1982), Australian rules footballer from Victoria
Erv Wilson (1928–2016), Mexican/American music theorist
Ethel Wilson (1888–1980), Canadian writer
Ethel Sylvia Wilson (1902–1983), Canadian seamstress, labour activist and politician from Alberta
Eugene McLanahan Wilson (1833–1890), U.S. Representative for Minnesota, 1869–1871
Eugene Wilson (English footballer) (1932–2007), English footballer
Eugene Wilson (American football) (born 1980), NFL football player

F
F. Paul Wilson (born 1946), American author
Fergal Wilson (born 1979), Irish Gaelic footballer
Fiammetta Wilson (1864-1920), British astronomer
Flip Wilson, born Clerow Wilson Jr. (1933–1998), American comedian and actor
Frae Wilson (born 1989), New Zealand rugby union footballer
Fran Wilson (born 1991), English cricketer
Frances Wilson (writer) (born 1964), British author
Frances C. Wilson, American general
Francis Wilson (disambiguation), multiple people
Francis Wilson (lichenologist) (1832–1903), Australian lichenologist
Francis H. Wilson (1844–1910), U.S. Representative from New York
Francis Wilson (actor) (1854–1935), American actor
Francis W. Wilson (1870–1947), American architect
Francis Adrian Wilson (1874–1954), British Army officer
Francis Wilson (rugby union) (1876–1957), British rugby union player who competed in the 1900 Summer Olympics
Francis Wilson (English cricketer) (1876–1964), British Army officer and cricketer
Francis Stuart Wilson (1883–1915), Royal Marines officer and pilot; cricketer in Jamaica
Francis Gordon Wilson (1900–1959), New Zealand architect
Francis Wilson (meteorologist) (born 1949), British weather forecaster
Frank Wilson (disambiguation)
Fred Wilson (politician) (born 1941), Canadian politician
Fred Wilson (artist) (born 1954), African American conceptual artist
Fred Wilson (financier) (born 1961), New York-based venture capitalist
Frederica Wilson (born 1942), American Congresswoman
Frederick Wilson (disambiguation), multiple people
Freya Wilson (born 1999), British actress

G
G. Willow Wilson (born 1982), American comics writer, author and journalist
Gahan Wilson (1930–2019), American author and cartoonist
Garrett Wilson (born 2000), American football wide receiver
Garrett Wilson (ice hockey) (born 1991), Canadian professional ice hockey winger  
Garry and Gary Wilson (disambiguation), multiple people
Garry Wilson (born 1953), Australian rules footballer (nicknamed "Flea")
Garry Wilson (footballer) (born 1963), Scottish footballer
Gary Wilson (second baseman) (1879–1969), Major League Baseball second baseman for the Boston Americans
Gary L. Wilson, American businessman
Gary Wilson (politician) (born 1946), Canadian politician
Gary Wilson (musician) (born 1953), American experimental musician
Gary Wilson (1970s pitcher) (born 1954), Major League Baseball pitcher for the Houston Astros
Gary Wilson (1990s pitcher) (born 1970), Major League Baseball pitcher for the Pittsburgh Pirates
Gary Wilson (snooker player) (born 1985), English snooker player
Gary Wilson (cricketer) (born 1986), Irish cricketer
Gayle Wilson (born 1942), American businesswoman and First Lady of California
Gene Wilson (American football) (1926–2002), NFL football player
Geoff and Geoffrey Wilson (disambiguation), multiple people
Geoff Wilson (Canadian politician) (born 1941), member of the Canadian House of Commons
Geoff Wilson (Australian politician) (born 1952), member of the Queensland Parliament
Geoff Wilson (professor) (1938–2020), Australian nuclear physicist
Geoffrey Plumpton Wilson (1878–1934), English amateur footballer
Geoffrey Wilson (cricketer) (1895–1960), English cricketer
Geoffrey Wilson (British politician) (1903–1975), British Conservative politician
George Wilson (disambiguation), multiple people
George Wilson (Royal Navy officer) (1756–1826), British naval officer
George Wilson (racewalker) (1766–1839), Newcastle born character and competitive walker/athlete
George Wilson (reformer) (1808–1870), English political activist, chairman of the Anti-Corn Law League
George Wilson (mayor) (1816–1902), mayor of Pittsburgh
George Wilson (chemist) (1818–1859), Scottish chemist and museum director
George Fergusson Wilson (1822–1902), English industrial chemist
George Washington Wilson (1823–1893), pioneering Scottish photographer
Jurgen Wilson 'George' Jurgen Wilson (1836–1897), German-American Union Army officer
George W. Wilson (politician) (1840–1909), member of the United States House of Representatives
George P. Wilson (1840–1920), Minnesota lawyer and politician
George Grafton Wilson (1863–1951), distinguished professor of international law
George Wilson (Australian cricketer) (1868–1920), Australian cricketer
George Wilson (pitcher) (1875–1915), American baseball pitcher, Negro leagues career 1895–1905
George Wilson (cricketer, born 1887) George Charles Lee Wilson (1887–1917), New Zealand cricketer
George Alfred Wilson (1877–1962), English cricketer
George Wilson (footballer, born 1883) (1883–1960), Scottish professional international footballer
George A. Wilson (1884–1953), United States Senator and Governor of Iowa
George Wilson (VC) (1886–1926), Scottish recipient of the Victoria Cross
George Wilson (footballer, born 1892) (1892–1961), Sheffield Wednesday and England footballer
George Wilson (Australian politician) (1895–1942), member of the New South Wales Legislative Assembly
 George Wilson, known as Wildcat Wilson (1901–1963), US American football player
George Clifford Wilson (1902–1957), English cricketer
George Wilson (footballer, born 1905) (1905–1984), Scottish football midfielder
George H. Wilson (1905–1985), member of the United States House of Representatives
George Wilson (American football halfback) (1905–1990), American football halfback, U.S. Marine general
George Ambler Wilson (1906–1977), British civil engineer
George Wilson (American football coach) (1914–1978), US American football player and coach
George Wilson (Yorkshire cricketer) (1916–2002), English cricketer
George Wilson (Australian footballer) (1920–2014), Australian rules footballer for Collingwood and St Kilda
George Wilson (rugby), Scottish rugby union and rugby league footballer who played in the 1940s, and 1950s
George Wilson (outfielder) (1925–1975), professional baseball player
George Balch Wilson (1927–2021), American composer, Professor Emeritus at the University of Michigan
George Wilson (basketball, born 1942), retired American professional basketball player
George Wilson (quarterback) (1943–2011), US American football player
George Wilson (actor) (born 1970), British actor
George Wilson (safety) (born 1981), US American football player
Georges Wilson (1921–2010), French film and TV actor
Georgia Wilson (field hockey) (born 1996), Australian field hockey player
Georgia Wilson (equestrian) (born 1995), British para-equestrian
Georgia Wilson (footballer) (born 2002), English footballer
Georgina Wilson (born 1986), Filipina-British model
Gerald Wilson (1918–2014), American jazz musician
Gerald H. Wilson (1945–2005), American Old Testament scholar
Gerry Wilson (ice hockey) (1937–2011), Canadian ice hockey forward
Gertrude Wilson (1888 – 1968) American composer and pianist
Gibril Wilson (born 1981), Sierra Leonean-born American footballer
Gilbert Wilson (disambiguation), multiple people
Gilbert Livingston Wilson (1869–1930), ethnographer and Presbyterian minister
Gilbert Brown Wilson (1907–1991), American painter and muralist
Gilbert Wilson (bishop) (1918–1999), Bishop of Kilmore, Elphin and Ardagh, 1981–1993
Gilbert "Whip" Wilson (born 1947), member of the New Jersey General Assembly
Gillis Wilson (born 1977), American football player
Gill Robb Wilson (1892–1966), American; founder of the U.S. Civil Air Patrol
Gina Wilson (born 1952), Australian intersex activist
Giuseppe Wilson (1945–2022), English-born Italian international footballer
Glen and Glenn Wilson (disambiguation), multiple people
Glen P. Wilson (1923–2005), American executive director of the National Space Society
Glen Wilson (footballer) (1929–2005), English footballer
Glen Wilson (harpsichordist) (born 1952), American classical harpsichordist
Glen Wilson (squash) (born 1971), squash coach and squash player from New Zealand
Glenn Wilson (psychologist) (born 1942), specialist in personality
Glenn Wilson (baseball) (born 1958), Major League Baseball outfielder
Glenn Wilson (footballer) (born 1986), Salisbury defender
Gord Wilson (born 1932), Canadian ice hockey player
Gordon Wilson (disambiguation), multiple people
Gordon Crooks Wilson (1872–1937), Conservative and Unionist Party member of the Canadian House of Commons
 Major general Sir Gordon Wilson (British Army doctor) (1887–1971), British Army officer
Phat Wilson (Gordon Allan Wilson, 1895–1970), Canadian ice hockey player
Gordon Wilson (architect) (1900–1959), New Zealand architect
Gordon Wilson (American football) (1915–1997), US American football player
Gordon Wilson (peace campaigner) (1927–1995), peace campaigner and Irish senator
Gordon Wilson (Scottish politician) (1938–2017), leader of the Scottish National Party
Gordon Wilson (British Columbia politician) (born 1949), leader of British Columbia Liberal Party
Gordon Wilson (Nova Scotia politician), Canadian politician, member of the Nova Scotia House of Assembly
Graeme, Graham and Grahame Wilson (disambiguation), multiple people
Graeme Wilson (translator) (1919–1992), British academic and translator
Graham Wilson (rugby league) (1949–2005), Australian rugby league footballer
Graham Wilson (cricketer) (born 1970), English cricketer
Graham Malcolm Wilson (1917–1977), British physician
Grahame Wilson, Rhodesian Army officer
Grant M. Wilson (1931–2012), American thermodynamicist
Grant Wilson (born 1974), co-star/co-producer of the TV show Ghost Hunters
Greg and Gregory Wilson (disambiguation), multiple people
Greg Wilson (American football) (born 1990), US American footballer
Greg Wilson (DJ) (born 1960), British DJ
Gregory Wilson (cricketer) (born 1958), Australian cricket player
Gregory Wilson (magician), American magician
 Gregory D. Wilson, American comedian, actor and voice actor known as The Greg Wilson
Grenville Wilson (born 1932), English cricketer
Gretchen Wilson (born 1973), American country music singer
Gus Wilson (born 1963), English football player and coach
Guy Wilson (disambiguation), multiple people
Guy Fleetwood Wilson (1851–1940), British public servant
Guy Greville Wilson (1877–1943), British soldier, company director, and politician
Guy Wilson (cricketer) (1882–1917), English cricket player
Guy Wilson (actor) (born 1985), American actor

H
H. Abram Wilson (born 1946), American mayor of San Ramon, California
H. Clyde Wilson Jr. (1926–2010), American professor of anthropology
Halena Wilson (1897-1975), American activist, educator, and cooperative movement leader
Hamish Wilson (1942–2020), Scottish actor
Hank Wilson (1947–2008), American LGBT activist
Hannah Wilson (born 1989), Hong Kong swimmer
Hap Wilson, Canadian naturalist, author, illustrator and photographer
Harold Wilson (disambiguation), multiple people
Harold A. Wilson (physicist) (1874–1964), English physicist
Harold A. Wilson (athlete) (1885–1916), British track Olympian, 1500 m silver medalist in 1908
Harold Wilson (rower) (1903–1981), American rower
Harold Wilson (1916–1995), Baron Wilson of Rievaulx, British Prime Minister (1964–1970) and (1974–1976)
Harold E. Wilson (1921–1998), U.S. Marine, Medal of Honor recipient
Harriet E. Wilson (1825–1900), African–American novelist
Harriette Wilson (1786–1845), courtesan
Harrison Wilson Jr. (1925–2019), American educator and basketball coach
Harry Wilson (disambiguation), multiple people
Harry Leon Wilson (1867–1939), American novelist and dramatist
Harry Wilson (American football coach), US American football coach
Harry Wilson (Louisiana politician) Harry D. Wilson (1869–1948), American politician
Harry Wilson (Worcestershire cricketer) (1873–1906)
Harry Wilson (rugby league), English rugby league footballer who played in the early 1900s
Harry Wilson (Australian footballer) (1885–1972), Australian rules footballer with South Melbourne
Harry Wilson (hurdler) (1896–1979), New Zealand track and field athlete
Harry Wilson (Northamptonshire cricketer) (1897–1960)
Harry Wilson (actor) (1897–1978), American character actor born in London
Harry Wilson (halfback) (1902–1990), US American footballer
Harry Wilson (footballer, born 1953), English footballer
Harry L. Wilson (born 1957), professor of political science at Roanoke College
Harry Wilson (businessman) (born 1971), member of the auto industry task force, financial executive
Harry Wilson (footballer, born 1997), Welsh international footballer
Hay Wilson (died 1925), British Anglican priest
Heather Wilson (born 1960), American congresswoman
Heather Wilson (cyclist) (born 1982), Irish racing cyclist
Helen Wilson (disambiguation), multiple people
Henry Wilson (disambiguation), multiple people
Henry Wilson (sailor) (1740–1810), English naval captain of the British East India Company
Henry Wilson (Pennsylvania politician) (1778–1826), United States Congressman
Henry J. Wilson (U.S. Army officer) (1795–1872), U.S. Army officer
Henry Wilson (Suffolk politician) (1797–1866), Liberal Member of Parliament for West Suffolk 1835–1837
Henry Bristow Wilson (1803–1888), theologian and fellow of St John's College, Oxford
Henry Wilson (1812–1875), 18th vice-president and senator from Massachusetts
Henry Wilson (Yorkshire politician) (1833–1914), Liberal Member of Parliament for Holmfirth 1885–1912
Henry Lumpkin Wilson (1839–1917), Atlanta physician and city councilman
Henry Lane Wilson (1857–1932), U.S. Ambassador to Mexico
Henry Fuller Maitland Wilson (1859–1941), World War I British general
Henry Braid Wilson (1861–1954), Admiral of the U.S. Navy
Henry Van Peters Wilson (1863–1939), biology professor at University of North Carolina at Chapel Hill
Sir Henry Wilson, 1st Baronet Henry Hughes Wilson (1864–1922), British soldier and politician
Henry Wilson (architect) (1864–1934), British architect, jeweller and designer
Henry Wilson (baseball) (1876–1929), American baseball player
Henry Wilson (bishop) (1876–1961), bishop of Chelmsford and author
Henry Maitland Wilson, 1st Baron Wilson (1881–1964), British World War II general
Henry Wilson, Baron Wilson of Langside (1916–1997), Scottish lawyer, Labour politician and life peer
Henry Wilson (basketball) (born 1960s), American basketball player
Herbert Ward Wilson (1877–1955), Australian educator and naturalist
Herbert Wrigley Wilson (1866–1940), British journalist and naval historian
Hilda Wilson (1860 – 1918) British contralto and composer
Hill H. Wilson (1840-1896), American businessman and politician
Hobb Wilson (Harold Wilson) (1904–1977), Canadian ice hockey player
Horace Wilson (disambiguation), multiple people
Horace Hayman Wilson (1786–1860), English Orientalist
Horace Wilson (professor) (1843–1927), American professor of English who introduced baseball to Japan
Horace Wilson (politician) (1848–?), mayor of Winnipeg, Manitoba
Horace Wilson (cricketer) (1864–1923), Australian cricketer
Horace Wilson (civil servant) (1882–1972), British government official
Howard Wilson (born 1995), American football player
Hub Wilson (1909–1999), Canadian ice hockey player
Hugh and Hughie Wilson (disambiguation), multiple people
Hugh Irvine Wilson (1879–1925), golf course architect, member and designer of Merion Golf Club
Hugh R. Wilson (1885–1946), United States Ambassador to Germany, 1938
Hugh E. Wilson (1899–1962), American college sports coach
Hugh Wilson (Northern Ireland politician) (1905–1998), Independent Unionist supporter
Hugh Wilson (RAF officer) (1908–1990), British Royal Air Force officer
Hugh Wilson (director) (1943–2018), American actor/director and television series creator/producer
Hugh Wilson (New Zealand botanist) (born 1945), New Zealand botanist
Hugh Wilson (cricketer) (born 1958), English cricketer
Hugh Wilson (football manager), worked for Alloa Athletic FC and Cowdenbeath FC
Hughie Wilson (1869–1940), Scottish international footballer
Huntington Wilson (1875–1946), American diplomat and author; Assistant Secretary of State 1909–1913

I
Ian Wilson (disambiguation), one of the following
Ian Wilson (actor) (1901–1987), British actor
Ian Wilson (priest) (1920–1988), Dean of Argyll and The Isles
Ian Wilson (footballer, born 1923) (1923–1989), Scottish football player
Ian Wilson (cricketer) (1932–2013), Irish cricketer
Ian Wilson (politician) (1932–2013), Australian politician
Ian Wilson (cinematographer) (1939–2021), English cinematographer
Ian Wilson (author) (born 1941), writer on Christianity, history & science
Ian E. Wilson (born 1943), chief Librarian and Archivist of Canada
Ian Wilson (entrepreneur) (1943–2020), British entrepreneur and travel writer
Ian Wilson (footballer, born 1958), Scottish international football player
Ian Wilson (soccer) (born 1960), American soccer player
Ian Wilson (composer) (born 1964), Irish composer
Ian Wilson (phonetician) (born 1966), Canadian professor
Ian Wilson (swimmer) (born 1970), British swimmer
Ian Wilson (biologist) (fl. 2000s), American microbiologist
Ibbie McColm Wilson (1834-1908), poet
Ira Wilson (1867–1944), American dairy businessman and politician
Isaac Wilson (1780–1848), United States Representative from New York
Isaac Wilson (English politician) (1822–1899), English industrialist and Liberal Party MP from Middlesbrough
Isaac Wilson (New Zealand politician) (1840–1901), New Zealand MP
Isabel Wilson (1895–1982), British psychiatrist and civil servant
Isaiah Wilson (disambiguation), multiple people

J
J. C. Wilson (born 1956), American football cornerback
J. Frank Wilson (1941–1991), American singer, the lead vocalist of J. Frank Wilson and the Cavaliers
J. Keith Wilson, American art curator
J. S. Wilson (John Skinner "Belge" Wilson, 1888–1969), Scottish soldier and scouting notable
Jack Wilson (disambiguation), multiple people
Jacob Wilson (disambiguation), multiple people
Jacqueline Wilson (born 1945), English author
Jalen Wilson (born 2000), American basketball player
Jamar Wilson (born 1984), American basketball player
James Wilson (disambiguation), one of the following
James Wilson (1742–1798), signatory to the U.S. Declaration of Independence
James Wilson (Orangeman), founder of the Orange Institution
James Wilson (explorer) (1760–1814), brought the first British missionaries to Tahiti in 1797
James Wilson (revolutionary) (1760–1820), Scottish leader of the "Radical War" of 1820
James Wilson (globe maker) (1763–1835), Vermont globe maker
James Wilson (anatomist) (1765–1821), FRS, British professor of anatomy to RCS
James Wilson I (1766–1839), US Representative from New Hampshire
James Wilson (Upper Canada politician) (1770–1847), farmer and politician in Upper Canada
James Wilson (songwriter), 18th-century songwriter from Hexham, Northumberland, UK
James J. Wilson (1775–1824), US Senator from New Jersey
James Wilson (Pennsylvania politician) (1779–1868), US Representative from Pennsylvania
James Wilson (bishop) (1780–1857), Bishop of Cork
James Wilson (zoologist) (1795–1856), Scottish zoologist
James Wilson II (1797–1881), US Representative from New Hampshire, son of James Wilson I
James Wilson (businessman) (1805–1860), UK member of parliament and founder of The Economist magazine
 Sir William James Erasmus Wilson (1809–1884), British surgeon
James Wilson (Ontario MPP) (1810–1891), member of the 1st Parliament of Ontario
 Sir James Milne Wilson (1812–1880), Premier of Tasmania, 1869–1872
James Wilson (New Zealand politician, born 1814) (1814–1898), New Zealand farmer and politician
James Charles Wilson (1816–1861), Wilson County, Texas was named after him
James Wilson (architect) (1816–1900), Victorian architect in Bath, and partner in Wilson & Willcox
James Wilson (Indiana) (1825–1867), US Representative from Indiana
James Keys Wilson (1828–1894), architect in Cincinnati, Ohio
James F. Wilson (1828–1895), US Senator and Representative from Iowa
James Grant Wilson (1832–1914), American soldier, editor, and author
James Wilson (U.S. politician) (1835–1920), United States Secretary of Agriculture
James Wilson (Irish nationalist) (1836–1921), Fenian involved in the Catalpa rescue of 1876
James Wilson (Archdeacon of Manchester) (1836–1931), Canon of Worcester, theologian and science teacher
James H. Wilson (1837–1925), general in the United States Army
James Crocket Wilson (1841–1899), member of the Parliament of Canada from Quebec
James Wilson (New Zealand politician, born 1849) (1849–1929), New Zealand politician and farmer
James Phillips Wilson (1853–1925), South Australian Labor politician sacked by his party
James Wilson (Australian rules footballer) (1856–1935), Geelong
James Thomas Wilson (1861–1945), FRS, British professor of anatomy, Cambridge
James Wilson (New South Wales politician, born 1862) (1862–1925)
James Wilson (New South Wales politician, born 1865) (1865–1927)
James Robert Wilson (1866–1941), mayor of Saskatoon and member of the Parliament of Canada
James Wilson (footballer, born 1866) (c.1866–1900), Scottish footballer (Vale of Leven and Scotland)
James Clifton Wilson (1874–1951), US Representative from Texas
James Wilson (UK Labour politician) (1879–1943), UK MP, 1921–1922 and 1929–1931
James Southall Wilson (1880–1963), author, professor, and founder of the Virginia Quarterly Review
James Wilson (athlete) (1891–1973), British athlete
James Wilson (footballer, born 1895) (1895–1917), Scottish footballer (Queen's Park)
James B. Wilson (1896–1986), American football player and coach
James Wilson (cinematographer), British cinematographer
James G. Wilson (1915–1987), embryologist and anatomist
James H. Wilson (American football) (1940–2013), American football coach
 James Harold Wilson (1916–1995), Prime Minister of the United Kingdom, 1964–1970 and 1974–1976
James M. Wilson, Jr. (1918–2009), U.S. Assistant Secretary of State
James Wilson (British Army officer) (1921–2004), British general
James Kinnier Wilson (1921–2022), British Assyriologist
James Wilson (composer) (1922–2005), Irish composer
James "Mark" Wilson (1929–2021), American magician
James Q. Wilson (1931–2012), professor of public policy at Pepperdine University
James A. Wilson, mathematician
James Wilson (scientist), gene therapy researcher
James Wilson (darts player) (born 1972), English darts player
James Daniel Wilson (born 1977), English actor
James Wilson (rugby union) (born 1983), New Zealand rugby union player
James Wilson (footballer born 1989), Welsh professional footballer with Oldham Athletic
James Wilson (footballer born 1995), English professional footballer with Manchester United
Jamie Wilson (disambiguation), multiple people
Jamil Wilson (born 1990), American basketball player in the Israeli Basketball Premier League
Jan Wilson (Australian politician) (1939–2010), Australian politician
Jan Wilson (1944–2010), English politician (Sheffield)
Jane Wilson (1924–2015), American painter
Janet Wilson (born 1948), UK-based New Zealand academic
Janet Woodrow Wilson (1826-1888), mother of Woodrow Wilson
Jared Wilson (footballer) (born 1989), English footballer
Jason Wilson (disambiguation), multiple people
Jason Wilson (politician) (born 1968), Democratic member of the Ohio Senate
Jason Wilson (musician) (born 1970), Canadian musician and author
Jason Wilson (field hockey), Australian national team field hockey player
Jason Wilson (ice hockey) (born 1990), Canadian ice hockey player
Jasper Wilson (basketball) (born 1947), American basketball player
Jasper Wilson (politician) (1819–1896), American preacher and politician in Georgia
Jean Wilson (speed skater) (1910–1933), Canadian skater
Jean Wilson (Pennsylvania politician) (1928–2014), American politician in Pennsylvania
Jean Moorcroft Wilson (born 1941), British academic and writer
Jeanne Wilson (1926–2018), American Olympic swimmer
Jeff and Jeffrey Wilson (disambiguation), several people
Jeff Wilson (footballer) (born 1964), English footballer
Jeff Wilson (sportsman) (born 1973), New Zealand rugby and cricket player
Jeff Wilson (Canadian politician) (born c. 1978), Canadian politician
Jeff Wilson (racing driver), British auto racing driver 
Jeff Wilson (professor), American professor and academic dumpster diver
Jeff Wilson (American football) (born 1995), American football player
Jeffrey A. Wilson, American professor of geological sciences
Jenell Slack-Wilson (born 1984), American voice actress for PB&J Otter
Jennie Scott Wilson (1875-1951) American child prodigy as an elocutionist
Jennifer and Jenny Wilson, several people
Jennifer Wilson (born 1968), American opera singer
Jennifer Wilson (field hockey) (born 1979), South African field hockey player
 Jennifer Wilson, American roller derby skater known as Hydra (skater)
Jennifer P. Wilson (born 1975), American federal judge
Jenny Wilson (politician) (born 1965), American politician in Salt Lake City
Jenny Wilson (singer) (born 1975), Swedish singer-songwriter
Jeremy Wilson (1944–2017), British historian and writer
Jerome L. Wilson (1931–2019), New York state senator
Jeron Wilson (born 1977), American professional skateboarder
Jerry Wilson (disambiguation), multiple people
Jessica Wilson, American philosopher
Jessie Woodrow Wilson Sayre (1887–1933), American political activist; daughter of Woodrow Wilson
Jez Wilson (born 1979), English boxer
Jim and Jimmy Wilson (disambiguation), several people
Jim Wilson (Los Angeles) (1872–1956), banker and City Council member
Jim Wilson (soccer) (fl. 1924), Canadian international soccer player
Jim Wilson (pitcher) (1922–1986), American pitcher in Major League Baseball, 1945–1958
Jim Wilson (Australian footballer) (born 1930), Australian rules footballer for Melbourne
Jim Wilson (Northern Ireland politician) (born 1941), member of the Northern Ireland Assembly
Jim Wilson (wrestler) (1942–2009), American football player, professional wrestler
Jim Wilson (Oklahoma politician) (1947–2018), Oklahoma state senator
Jim Wilson (basketball) (born 1948), American professional basketball player
Jim Wilson (first baseman) (born 1960), American Major League Baseball player
Jim Wilson (Ontario politician) (born 1963), politician in Ontario, Canada
Jim Wilson (sports journalist) (born 1968), Australian television sports reporter
Jim Wilson (guitar player), guitar player for Mother Superior and the Rollins Band
Jim Wilson (producer), American movie producer
Jimmy Wilson (baseball) (1900–1947), American baseball player and manager and professional soccer player
Jimmy Wilson (laborer) (c.1903–1973), African-American who was sentenced to death for stealing $1.95
Jimmy Wilson (footballer, born 1916) (fl. 1930–1939), English footballer of the 1930s
Jimmy Wilson (blues musician) (1921 or 1923–1965), West Coast blues singer of the 1950s
Jimmy Wilson (footballer, born 1924) (1924–1987), aka Tug Wilson, English footballer of the 1940s and 1950s
Jimmy Wilson (politician) (1931–1986), Louisiana politician
Jimmy Wilson (footballer, born 1942), Scottish footballer
Jimmy Wilson (American football) (born 1986), American football cornerback
Joan Dolores Wilson (born 1933), American composer and harpist
JoAnn Wilson (1939–1983), wife of Canadian politician, Colin Thatcher who was convicted of her murder
Jock Wilson (serviceman) (John Nicholson "Jock" Wilson, 1903–2008), Scottish soldier and centenarian
Jock Wilson (police officer) (1922–1993), British police officer
Jocky Wilson (1950–2012), Scottish darts player
Jody Wilson-Raybould (born 1971), Canadian politician
Jorge Wilson, Argentinian Olympic field hockey player
Joe Wilson (disambiguation), several people
Joe Wilson (Geordie singer) (1841–1875), Prolific Geordie dialect singer, songwriter
Joe Wilson (footballer, born 1861) (1861–1952), footballer for Stoke, Aston Villa and West Bromwich Albion
Joe Wilson (1920s and 1930s footballer), played for Gillingham and Walsall
Joe Wilson (bobsleigh) (1935–2019), American Olympic bobsledder
Joe Wilson (footballer, born 1937) (1937–2015), played at full back for Nottingham Forest and Wolverhampton Wanderers
Joe Wilson (U.S. politician) (born 1947), U.S. Representative from South Carolina
Joe Wilson (musician), member of the British band Sneaker Pimps
Joel Wilson (umpire) (born 1966), cricket umpire from Trinidad and Tobago
Joel Wilson (rugby player) (born 1977), Australian rugby player
Joemy Wilson, American hammered dulcimer player
John, Johnnie and Johnny Wilson (disambiguation), several people
John Wilson (MP for Castle Rising) (fl. 1621), British politician
John Wilson (minister) (1591–1667), Puritan minister of the Boston Church in Massachusetts
John Wilson (composer) (1595–1674), composer and lutenist
John Wilson (playwright) (1626–1696), English playwright
John Wilson (mathematician) (1741–1793), English mathematician
John Wilson (South Carolina) (1773–1828), member of the U.S. House of Representatives
John Wilson (painter) (1774–1855), Scottish painter
John Wilson (Massachusetts) (1777–1848), member of the U.S. House of Representatives, 1813
John Wilson (governor) (1780–1856), acting Governor of British Ceylon
John Lyde Wilson (1784–1849), governor of South Carolina, 1822–1824
John Wilson (Scottish writer) (1785–1854), Scottish writer
John Wilson (Lieutenant Governor of Quebec), Canadian viceroy in 1816
John Williams Wilson (1798–1857), English sailor
John Wilson (historian) (1799–1870), author of Our Israelitish Origin (1840)
John Wilson (singer) (1800–1849), Scottish tenor
John Mackay Wilson (1804–1835), Scottish writer
John Wilson (missionary) (1804–1875), Scottish missionary
John Wilson (Ontario politician) (1807–1869), lawyer, judge and political figure in Ontario, Canada
John Wilson (bureaucrat) (1807–1876), official in the United States Department of the Treasury
John Cracroft Wilson (1808–1881), British-educated civil servant in India, politician in New Zealand
John Leighton Wilson (1809–?), missionary to West Africa
John Thomas Wilson (1811–1891), member of the U.S. House of Representatives from Ohio
John Bowie Wilson (1820–1883), politician in colonial New South Wales
John Nathanial Wilson (1822–1895), Member of the New Zealand Legislative Council
John Marius Wilson, author of Imperial Gazetteer of England and Wales
John Wilson (philanthropist) (1826–1900), Irish-born pioneer of the American West
John Wilson (Govan MP) (1828–1905), member of Parliament for Govan, 1889–1900
John Alexander Wilson (1829–1909), New Zealand farmer, soldier, public servant, judge and businessman
John Wilson (Edinburgh MP) (1830–?), member of Parliament for Edinburgh
John Wilson (Royal Navy officer) (1834–1885), British admiral
John Henry Wilson (Canadian politician) (1834–1912), physician, professor and political figure in Ontario, Canada
John Wilson (1837–1915), British miner, trade unionist and Liberal-Labour politician
John Moulder Wilson (1837–1919), Union Army engineer
John Wilson (Glasgow St. Rollox MP) (1837–1928), UK politician, member of Parliament for Glasgow St Rollox
John Wilson (Caddo) (1840–1901), leader in the Native American Church movement
John G. Wilson (1842–1892), UK patent agent
Sir John Wilson, 1st Baronet (1844–1918), UK politician, Member of Parliament for Falkirk
John Frank Wilson (1846–1911), delegate to the US House of Representatives from Arizona Territory
John Henry Wilson (Kentucky) (1846–1923), lawyer and member of the US House of Representatives, 1889–1893
John Cook Wilson (1849–1915), English philosopher
John Wilson (priest) (1849–1926), Provost of St Mary's Cathedral, Edinburgh
John L. Wilson (1850–1912), U.S. Senator from Washington State
John Wilson (Captain) (1851–1899), Swedish sailor
John Appleton Wilson (1851–1927), American architect
John Wilson (Yorkshire cricketer) (1857–1931), English cricketer
John William Wilson (1858–1932), British politician
John Haden Wilson (1867–1946), Pennsylvania politician
John H. Wilson (Hawaii) (1871–1956), mayor of Honolulu, Hawaii
John Wilson (cyclist) (1876–1957), British Olympic road racing cyclist
John A. Wilson (sculptor) (1877–1954), Canadian sculptor from Nova Scotia
John Wilson (sport shooter) (1879–1940), Dutch sport shooter
J. Dover Wilson (John Dover Wilson, 1881–1969), professor and scholar of Renaissance literature
John Wilson (1910s pitcher) (1890–1954), American MLB pitcher for the Washington Senators
John Wilson (industrial chemist) (1890–1976), British chemist
John Charles Wilson (1892–1968), Northern Irish politician (MP [Northern Irish] 1933–1938)
 John Leonard Wilson (1897–1970), Anglican Bishop of Singapore
Sir John Wilson, 2nd Baronet (1898–1975), Keeper of the Royal Philatelic Collection
John C. Wilson (1899–1961), Broadway producer and director
John A. Wilson (Egyptologist) (1899–1976), American Egyptologist
John Wilson (1920s pitcher) (1903–1980), American MLB pitcher for the Boston Red Sox
John Tuzo Wilson (1908–1993), Canadian geophysicist
John S. Wilson (music critic) (1913–2002), American music critic and jazz radio host
John Wilson (footballer, born 1914) (1914–1988), English football (soccer) player
John T. Wilson (1914–1990), president of the University of Chicago, 1975–1978
John Long Wilson (1914–2001), medical professor and university administrator
John "Weenie" Wilson (1914–1968), American football player and multi-sport coach
John Burgess Wilson (1917–1993), British author, pen name Anthony Burgess
John Wilson (blind activist) (1919–1999), founder, International Agency for the Prevention of Blindness
John David Wilson (1919–2013), English artist, animator and producer
John Wilson (trade unionist) (1920–1996), Scottish trade union general secretary
John Wilson (Irish politician) (1923–2007), Irish politician
John Wilson, 2nd Baron Moran (1924–2014), British soldier and diplomat
 John E. Wilson (1927–2019), American basketball player known as Jumping Johnny Wilson
John Howard Wilson (1930–2015), Scottish rugby union player
John Wilson (footballer, born 1934), English football (soccer) player
John Wilson (Australian rules footballer) (1940–2019), Australian rules football player for Richmond
John Wilson (London politician) (born c.1941), leader, Greater London Council, 1984
John A. Wilson (politician) (1943–1993), member of the Council of the District of Columbia
John Wilson (angler) (1943–2018), British angler
John Wilson (British Columbia politician) (born 1944), Legislative Assembly of British Columbia, Canada
John Wilson (drummer) (born 1947), musician from Northern Ireland
John Wilson (Canadian writer) (born 1951), children's writer, winner of the Norma Fleck Award
John Wilson (New Zealand rugby league), New Zealand rugby league international
John J. B. Wilson (born 1954), founder of the Golden Raspberry Awards, 1980
 John Carl David Wilson (1955–2006) (Back Alley John), Canadian blues singer-songwriter and harmonica player
John Wilson (Scottish Green politician) (born 1956), member of the Scottish Parliament (MSP)
John Wilson (golfer) (born 1959), American professional golfer
John Wilson (Garda) (born 1962/63), Irish Garda officer
John Wilson (broadcaster) (born 1965), British journalist and broadcaster
John Wilson (conductor) (born 1972), orchestral conductor
John Wilson (soccer) (born 1977), American soccer player
John Wilson (Australian rugby league) (born 1978), Australian rugby league player who has represented France
John Wilson (Kansas politician) (born 1983), Democratic member of the Kansas House of Representatives
John Wilson (basketball) (born 1985), Filipino basketball player
John Parker Wilson (born 1985), US American football player
John Wilson (Scottish academic), professor of public policy and management at Glasgow Caledonian University
John Wilson Jr. (professor), professor of English in Japan
John S. Wilson (economist), economist at the World Bank
John Silvanus Wilson, Jr., Morehouse College president
Johnnie Wilson (born 1944), American Army four-star general
Johnny Wilson (boxer) (1893–1985), American boxer
Johnny Wilson (ice hockey) (1929–2011), Canadian ice hockey player and coach
Jomo Wilson (born 1983), American footballer
Jonathan Wilson (disambiguation), several people
Jonathan Wilson (musician) (born 1974), American psychedelic folk musician
Jonathan Wilson (writer) (born 1976), British sports journalist and author
Jonathan Wilson (actor) (active since 1990), Canadian actor and playwright
Jonathan Wilson (author) (active since 1994), British-born writer and professor
José Wilson (born 1931), Brazilian modern pentathlete
Joseph Wilson (disambiguation) several people named Joseph or Joe
Joseph S. Wilson, U.S Treasury and Department of the Interior official
Joseph Ruggles Wilson (1822–1903), theologian and father of Woodrow Wilson
Joseph Ruggles Wilson Jr. (1867-1827), brother of Woodrow Wilson
Joseph G. Wilson (1826–1873), U.S. Representative from Oregon
Joseph Lapsley Wilson (1844–1928), American railroad executive, author and horticulturalist
Joseph Havelock Wilson (1859–1929), British trade union leader and Liberal politician
Joseph Vivian Wilson (1894–1977), New Zealand ambassador to France
Joseph Franklin Wilson (1901–1968), U.S. Representative from Texas
Joseph C. Wilson (entrepreneur) (1909–1971), founder of the Xerox Corporation
Joe Lee Wilson (1935–2011), American gospel-influenced jazz singer
Joseph Bearwalker Wilson (1942–2004), shamanist and founder of the 1734 tradition of witchcraft
Joseph C. Wilson (1949–2019), United States ambassador and husband of Valerie Plame Wilson
Joseph Wilson (English cricketer) (born 1965), English cricketer
Josh Wilson (baseball) (born 1981), American professional baseball player
Josh Wilson (musician) (born 1983), American contemporary Christian musician
Josh Wilson (American football) (born 1985), American professional football player
Joyce Vincent Wilson (born 1946), American singer
Juanita Wilson, Irish film director and writer
Jud Wilson (1894–1963), American baseball player and manager
Judy McIntosh Wilson (born 1937), New Zealand sculptor and fibre artist
Judy Wilson (actress) (1938–2006), English actress
Judy Blye Wilson, American casting director
Ju Ju Wilson, Australian artist
Julia Wilson (born 1978), Australian Olympic rower
Julian Wilson (commentator) (1940–2014), English horse racing commentator
Julian Wilson (surfer) (born 1988), Australian professional surfer
Julie Wilson (1924–2015), American singer and actress
Julius Wilson (born 1983), American football offensive tackle
Justin Wilson (disambiguation), several people
Justin Wilson (chef) (1914–2001), American chef and humorist
Justin P. Wilson (born 1945), comptroller and deputy governor of Tennessee
Justin Wilson (racing driver) (1978–2015), British Formula One and IndyCar driver
Justin Wilson (baseball) (born 1987), American baseball pitcher

K
Kaia Wilson (born 1974), American musician
Kandace Wilson (born 1984), American soccer player
Karl Wilson (born 1964), US American footballer
Kate Wilson (scientist), UK–Australian zoologist
Kate Wilson-Smith (born 1979), Australian badminton player
Katherine Austen née Wilson (1629–c.1683), writer
Katherine Sheppard née Wilson (1847–1934), suffragette in New Zealand
Kay Wilson (rugby union) (born 1991), English rugby union player
Keith Wilson (disambiguation) one of the following
Keith Wilson (cricketer) (1894–1977), English cricketer
Keith Wilson (South Australian politician) (1900–1987), Senator for South Australia and later federal member for Sturt
Keith Wilson (musician) (1916–2013), American clarinetist and Yale University music instructor
Keith Wilson (production designer) (1941–2011), British television and film production designer
Keith Wilson (shearer), New Zealand shearer
Keith M. Wilson, historian and author
Kelly-Anne Wilson (born 1975), South African Olympic fencer
Kelsey Wilson (born 1986), Canadian ice hockey player
Kelvin Wilson (born 1985), English footballer
Kenneth Wilson (disambiguation), one of the following
Ken Wilson (ice hockey) (1923–2008), Canadian minor hockey league general manager and owner
Ken Wilson (sportscaster) (born 1947), American sports broadcaster
Kenneth L. Wilson (1896–1979), American track athlete
Kenneth G. Wilson (author) (1923–2003), American author and editor
Kenneth G. Wilson (1936–2013), American theoretical physicist awarded the Nobel Prize
Kenneth T. Wilson (born 1936), American politician in the New Jersey General Assembly
Kenneth Wilson (canoeist) (born 1938), American Olympic canoer
 Kenneth Robert Wilson (born 1965), American drummer for band Marilyn Manson, aka Kenny, better known as Ginger Fish
Kenny Wilson (footballer) (born 1946), Scottish footballer
Kenny Gasana (born 1984), American-born Rwandan basketball player, formerly known as Kenny Wilson
Kenny Wilson (baseball) (born 1990), American baseball outfielder
Keri-Lynn Wilson (born 1967), Canadian conductor
Kerrie Wilson, Australian environmental scientist 
Kerry-Jayne Wilson (late 20th/early 21st c.), New Zealand biologist and professor
Kevin Wilson (disambiguation) one of the following
Kevin Bloody Wilson (born 1947), Australian comedian
Kevin Wilson (American football) (born 1961), American football coach
Kevin Wilson (footballer, born 1961), Northern Irish footballer
Kevin Wilson (footballer born 1976), Jamaican footballer
Kevin Wilson (writer), American writer
Kevin J. Wilson, Australian actor
Kevin Wilson (game designer), American designer of board games and role-playing games
Kim Wilson (born 1951), American blues singer and harmonica player
Kinsey Wilson (born 1955), American journalist
Kion Wilson (born 1986), American football linebacker
Kirby Wilson (born 1961), American football coach
Kirk Wilson (born 1977), American soccer player
Kortney Wilson (born 1979), Canadian country music singer
Kris Wilson (American football) (born 1981), American football player
Kris Wilson (baseball) (born 1976), American baseball player
Kristen Wilson (born 1969), American actress
Kristian Wilson (cricketer) (born 1982), English cricketer
Kyle Wilson (ice hockey) (born 1984), Canadian ice hockey forward
Kyle Wilson (English footballer) (born 1985), English footballer
Kyle Wilson (cornerback) (born 1987), American football cornerback
Kym Wilson (born 1973), Australian actress and TV host
Kyren Wilson (born 1991), English snooker player

L
Lainey Wilson, American singer
Lamayn Wilson (born 1980), American basketball player
Lambert Wilson (born 1958), French actor
Landon Wilson (born 1975), American ice hockey player
Lanford Wilson (1937–2011), American playwright
Larissa Wilson (born 1989), English actress
Larry Wilson (disambiguation), several people
Larry Wilson (ice hockey) (1930–1979), Canadian ice hockey player
Larry Wilson (American football) (1938–2020), American football player
Larry Jon Wilson (1940–2010), American country singer, guitarist and musician
Larry Wilson (screenwriter) (born 1948), American screenwriter
Larry Y. Wilson (born 1949), general authority of The Church of Jesus Christ of Latter-day Saints
Laura Wilson (photographer) (born 1939), American photographer
Laura Wilson (writer) (born 1964), London based crime novel writer
Laura Wilson (actress) (born 1983), New Zealand actress
Lauren Wilson (born 1987), Canadian figure skater
Laurence Wilson (born 1986), English footballer
Lawrence Wilson (born 1987), American footballer
Leanne Wilson (born 1980), British actress
Lee Wilson (footballer, born 1972), English football player and manager
Lee Wilson (footballer, born 1993), Scottish football goalkeeper for Cowdenbeath
Leigh Allison Wilson (born 1957), American novelist
Leonard Wilson (1897–1970), Anglican bishop of Singapore (1941–1949)
Leonard Gilchrist Wilson (1928–2018), Canadian-American historian of medicine and science
Les and Leslie Wilson (disambiguation), several people
Les Wilson (baseball) (1885–1969), American baseball player
Les Wilson (soccer) (born 1947), Canadian soccer administrator and professional player
Les Wilson (field hockey) (born 1952), New Zealand field hockey goalkeeper
Leslie Orme Wilson (1876–1955), soldier and politician
Leslie Wilson (cyclist) (1926–2006), British cyclist
Leslie Blackett Wilson (born 1930), chair of computing science at the University of Stirling
Leslie Wilson (author), author of novels and short stories
Lester Wilson (1942–1993), American dancer, choreographer and actor
Lewis Wilson (1920–2000), American actor
Lewis Wilson (footballer) (born 1993), English footballer
Lexi Wilson (born 1991), Bahamian beauty queen and model
Liam Wilson (born 1979), American bass player
Linda S. Wilson (born 1936), American academic administrator
Lindsay Wilson (rower) (born 1948), New Zealand Olympic rower
Lindsay Wilson (footballer) (born 1979), Australian international soccer player
Lindsay Wilson (minister), Northern Irish Presbyterian minister
Lindy Wilson, South African politician
Linetta Wilson (born 1967), American Olympic sprinter
Lionel Wilson (politician) (1915–1998), mayor of Oakland, California (1977–1991)
Lionel Wilson (voice actor) (1924–2003), voice actor
Lisa Wilson-Foley (born 1960), American entrepreneur
Logan Wilson (born 1996), American football player
Lois W. also known as Lois Wilson (née Burnham) (1891–1988), co-founder of Al-Anon
Lois Wilson (actress) (1894–1988), actress in silent films
Lois Miriam Wilson (born 1927), Moderator of the United Church of Canada
Lori Wilson (1937–2019), American politician
Louise Wilson (1962–2014), British professor of fashion design
Lucy Wilson (1888–1980), American physicist
Luis Wilson (born 1962), Peruvian politician
Luisa Wilson (born 2005), Mexican-Canadian ice hockey player
Luke Wilson (born 1971), American actor, brother of Andrew and Owen Wilson
Lydia Wilson (born 1984), Anglo-American actress and radio personality
Lynda Wilson (born 1960), American politician in Washington state
Lynton Wilson (born 1940), Canadian business executive

M
M. Roy Wilson (born 1953), President of Wayne State University
Mac Wilson (footballer, born 1914) (1914–2017), Carlton Australian rules footballer
Mac Wilson (footballer, born 1922) (1922–1966), Melbourne Australian rules footballer
Mack Wilson (born 1998), American football player
Macel Wilson (born 1943), Hawaiian beauty queen, artist and film editor for Danish Broadcasting Corporation
Maia Wilson (born 1997), New Zealand netball player
Mak Wilson (born 1957), English puppeteer, CG animation director, mocap artist and voice actor
Malcolm Wilson (governor) (1914–2000), Governor of New York
Malcolm Wilson (rally driver) (born 1956), British rally driver and motorsports personality
Mara Wilson (born 1987), American actress
Marc Wilson (American football) (born 1957), American football quarterback
Marc Wilson (Irish footballer) (born 1987), Irish footballer playing for Stoke
Marcus Wilson (American football) (born 1968), American football player
Marcus Wilson (baseball) (born 1996), American baseball player
Marcus Wilson (basketball) (born 1977), American basketball player
Margaret Wilson (disambiguation) one of the following
Margaret Wilson (Scottish martyr) (died 1685), one of the Solway Martyrs
Margaret Wilson (novelist) (1882–1973), American novelist
Margaret Woodrow Wilson (1886–1944), First Lady of the United States, daughter of Woodrow Wilson
Margaret Wilson (tennis) (fl.1930s), Australian tennis player
Margaret Bush Wilson (1919–2009), American activist
Margaret Dauler Wilson (1939–1998), American philosopher and professor of philosophy
Margaret Wilson (cricketer) (born 1946), Australian cricket player
Margaret Wilson (born 1947), New Zealand politician
Margaret Wilson (judge) (born 1953), justice of the Supreme Court of Queensland
Margaret Nales Wilson (born 1989), British-Filipino model, actress and beauty queen
Margaret Wilson (Australian writer), Australian television writer
Margo Wilson (1942–2009), Canadian psychologist
Marguerite Wilson (1918–1972), English cyclist
Mari Wilson (born 1954), British singer
Marian Robertson Wilson (1926–2013), American cellist, linguist and teacher
Marie Wilson (American actress) (1916–1972), American radio, film, and television actress
Marie Wilson (soap opera actress) (born 1974), American-Canadian soap actress
Marie C. Wilson, feminist, author and political activist in the United States
Marilyn Wilson (swimmer) (born 1943), Australian Olympic swimmer
Mário Wilson (1929–2016), Mozambican football player and manager
Marion Wilson (boxer) (born 1956), American boxer
Marius Wilson, Saint Lucian politician
Marjorie Wilson (born 1951), English geologist and petrologist
Mark Wilson (disambiguation), multiple people
Marquess Wilson (born 1992), American footballer
Marquise Wilson, American actor
Martez Wilson (born 1988), American footballer
Martha Loftin Wilson (1834–1919), American missionary worker, journal editor, heroine of the American Civil War
Martha Wilson (born 1947), American performance artist
Martin Wilson (writer) (born 1973), American writer
Martin Wilson (artist), Australian artist
Marty Wilson (poker player) (1957–2019), English professional poker player
Marty Wilson (basketball) (born 1966), American college basketball coach
Marvin Wilson (disambiguation), multiple people
Mary Wilson (disambiguation)
Mary Wilson (broadcaster), Irish broadcaster and journalist
Mary Wilson (singer) (1944–2021), American singer, founding member of The Supremes
Mary Wilson, Baroness Wilson of Rievaulx (1916–2018), English poet and wife of Harold Wilson
Mary Ann Wilson (born 1936), nurse and TV exercise presenter
Mary Ellen Wilson (1864–1956), child abuse victim whose case led to the founding of the New York Society for the Prevention of Cruelty to Children
Mary Elizabeth Wilson (1893–1963), serial killer known as "the Merry widow of Windy Nook"
Mary Evans Wilson (1866–1928), Boston civil rights activist
Mary Jane Wilson (1840-1916), English founder of religious order, named as "Venerable"
Mary Louise Wilson (born 1931), American film, musical theatre, stage and television actress
Matilda Ellen Wilson (1860 – 1918) British contralto and composer
Matt and Matthew Wilson (disambiguation), several people
Matt Wilson (footballer) (1842–1897), Irish international footballer of 1880s
Matt Wilson (jazz drummer) (born 1964), American jazz drummer
Matt Wilson (singer) (born 1963), American singer-songwriter and drummer
Matt Wilson (artist), American artist known for his work on role-playing games
Matthew Wilson (cyclist) (born 1977), Australian road cyclist
Matthew Wilson (born 1987), English rally driver
Maurice Wilson (1898–1934), British soldier, mystic, mountaineer and aviator
Maurice Wilson (footballer), Scottish footballer
Mavis Wilson (born c.1949), Canadian politician in Ontario
Max Wilson (baseball) (1916–1977), American baseball pitcher
Max Wilson (born 1972), Brazilian racing driver
Maxine Wilson (born 1946), US-born Canadian politician in British Columbia
Megan Wilson, American visual artist
Mel Wilson (1917–2007), Canadian football player
Melanie Wilson (actress) (born 1961), American actress
Melanie Wilson (rower) (born 1984), British Olympic rower
Meri Wilson (1949–2002), American pop music singer
Mervyn Wilson (1922-2022), Irish Anglican priest
Micaela Wilson (born 1992), Australian netball player
Michael and Mike Wilson (disambiguation), multiple people
Millie Wilson (born 1948), American artist
Mitch Wilson (1962–2019), Canadian ice hockey player
Mitchell A. Wilson (1914–1973), American novelist and physicist
Monique Wilson (councilwoman), Saban councilwoman
Mookie Wilson (born 1956), American baseball player
Morland Wilson, Jamaican politician
Munira Wilson (born 1978), British Member of Parliament elected 2019
Murray Wilson (born 1951), Canadian ice hockey player
Murry Wilson (1917–1973), father of Brian, Dennis and Carl Wilson of The Beach Boys
Mutt Wilson (1896–1962), American baseball player
Myra Wilson, British computer scientist

N
N. D. Wilson (born 1978), American author
Nadine Wilson, Canadian politician in Saskatchewan
Nairn Wilson (born 1950), British dentist
Nancy Wilson (jazz singer) (1937–2018), American jazz singer
Nancy Wilson (rock musician) (born 1954), Musician, singer for American rock band Heart, sister of Ann Wilson
Naomi Wilson (born 1940), an Australian politician
Naomi Kahoilua Wilson (born 1949), American actor best known for the role of Mahana in Johnny Lingo
Natalie Wilson (born 1975), American gospel musician and artist
Nathan Wilson (1758–1834), American congressman
Nathan David Wilson (born 1978), American author
Nathan Wilson (footballer) (born 1993), Australian rules footballer from Western Australia
Nathaniel S. Wilson (born 1947), American master sailmaker, rigger and sail designer
Neal C. Wilson (1920–2010), General Conference president of the Seventh-day Adventist Church, 1979–1990
Neil Wilson (figure skater) (born 1978), British figure skater
Neil Wilson (baseball) (1935–2013), Major League Baseball player
H. Neil Wilson (c.1854–1926), American architect
Nemiah Wilson (born 1943), American footballer
Niamh Wilson (born 1997), Canadian actress
Nicholas or Nick Wilson (disambiguation), several people
Nicholas Wilson (parson) (died 1548), English clergyman
Nicholas Wilson, Lord Wilson of Culworth (born 1945), British judge
 Nicholas Wilson better known as Nick Gage (born 1980), professional wrestler
Nick Wilson (field hockey) (born 1990), field hockey player
Nick Wilson (American football) (born 1996), US American footballer
Nickiesha Wilson (born 1986), Jamaican Olympic hurdler
Nicola Wilson (née Payne; born 1969), Canadian-born, Dutch and New Zealand international cricketer
Nicola Wilson (née Tweddle; born 1976), British equestrian rider
Nigel Wilson (businessman) (born 1956), British businessman
Nigel Wilson (born 1970), Canadian baseball player
Nikita Wilson (born 1964), American basketball player
Nikki Wilson, British television producer
Nile Wilson (born 1996), British artistic gymnast
Noel Wilson (born 1979), Indian footballer
Norah Wilson (1901–1971), Australian Aboriginal community worker
Norma Wilson (1909–2000), New Zealand sprinter
Norma Wilson (cricketer) (1929–2022), Australian cricketer
Norman Frank Wilson (1876–1956), Canadian farmer and political figure
Norman D. Wilson (engineer) (1884–1967), Canadian transportation engineer
Norman Wilson (rugby union) (1922–2001), New Zealand rugby union player
Norman D. Wilson (actor) (1938–2004), American actor
Norries Wilson, American football coach
Norro Wilson (1938–2017), American country music singer-songwriter and producer

O
O. W. Wilson (1900–1972), American police chief and writer
Oliver Wilson (born 1980), English golfer
Olly Wilson (1937–2018), American composer
Omar Wilson, American R&B artist
O'Neil Wilson (born 1978), Canadian footballer
Orlando Wilson (television presenter) (born 1947), American TV fishing show presenter and angler
Oswald Wilson (1866–1950), Australian architect
Othell Wilson (born 1961), American basketball player
Otis Wilson (born 1957), US American footballer
Owen Wilson (born 1968), American actor, brother of Andrew and Luke Wilson

P
P. Wilson (born 1966), Indian lawyer
Paddy Wilson (1933–1973), Northern Ireland politician
Pat Wilson (born 1948), Australian singer and journalist
Patrice Wilson (born 1983), Nigerian-American music producer and singer-songwriter
Patricia Wilson (1929–2005), novelist
Patrick Wilson (disambiguation) one of the following
Patrick Wilson (librarian) (1927–2003), librarian, information scientist and philosopher
Patrick Wilson (American actor) (born 1973), U.S. stage, musical theatre, film and television actor
Patrick Wilson (drummer) (born 1969), drummer for the band Weezer
Patrick Wilson (composer), British musician/composer
Paul Wilson one of the following
Paul Wilson, Baron Wilson of High Wray (1908–1980), British engineer, Lord Lieutenant, governor of the BBC
Paul Wilson (criminologist) (born 1941), Australian criminologist
Paul Wilson (translator) (born 1941), Canadian translator and writer
F. Paul Wilson (born 1946), American science fiction and horror author
Paul Wilson (pole vaulter) (born 1947), American pole vault world record holder
Paul Wilson (Scottish footballer) (1950–2017), Scotland international footballer
Paul David Wilson (born 1952), songwriter, composer, conductor, and music producer
Paul C. Wilson (born 1961), judge of the Supreme Court of Missouri
Paul Wilson (English footballer) (born 1968), English footballer
Paul Wilson (cricketer) (born 1972), Australian cricketer
Paul Wilson (baseball) (born 1973), American pitcher in Major League Baseball
Paul Wilson (footballer born 1977), English footballer for Gillingham F.C.
Paul Wilson (musician) (born 1978), bass guitarist for Snow Patrol
Paul Wilson (meditation teacher), author of The Little Book of Calm, The Quiet
Paul Wilson (music theorist), American music theorist and professor
R. Paul Wilson, sleight of hand expert
Paulette Wilson (1956–2020), British immigration activist
Pauline Wilson, Hawaiian jazz/pop singer
Peggy Wilson (Alaska politician) (born 1945), Alaska politician
Peggy Wilson (golfer) (born 1934), American golfer
Peggy Wilson (Louisiana politician) (born 1937), Louisiana politician
Penelope Wilson, British Egyptologist
Penny Wilson (born 1962), British windsurfer
Perce Wilson (1890–1936), NFL player
Percy Wilson (footballer) (1889–1941), Australian rules footballer
Percy Wilson (aviator) (1895–?), British World War I flying ace
Perry Wilson (1916–2009), American actress
Perry William Wilson (1902–1981), American microbiologist and biochemist
Peta Wilson (born 1970), Australian actress
Pete and Peter Wilson (disambiguation) one of the following
Pete Wilson (baseball) (1885–1957), American baseball pitcher
Pete Wilson (born 1933), American politician, US Senator from California and later Governor
Pete Wilson (broadcaster) (1945–2007), San Francisco Bay Area TV and radio personality
Pete Wilson (historian) (born 1957), British historian specialising in Roman archaeology
 Pete Wilson (bass guitarist) (born 1966), British bass guitarist
Pete Wilson (wrestler) (born 1985), Canadian professional wrestler
Peter Wilson (disambiguation), one of several people, including:
Peter Wilson (American soccer), Scottish-born American footballer in the 1890s and early 1900s
Peter Wilson (bishop) (1883–1956), Bishop of Moray, Ross and Caithness
Peter Wilson (footballer, born 1905) (1905–1983), Scottish international footballer of the 1920s and 1930s
Peter Lamborn Wilson (1945–2022), American political writer, essayist, and poet
Peter Wilson (footballer, born 1947), English-born captain of the Australian football team
Peter Wilson (architect) (born 1950), Australian architect
Peter Wilson (writer) (born 1951), Australian writer and commentator
Peter Wilson (Northern Ireland kidnapping and disappearance) (1952–1973), Northern Irish kidnap victim; one of the "Disappeared"
Peter Wilson (ski jumper) (born 1952), Canadian ski jumper
Peter Wilson (curler) (born 1961), Scottish-Irish curler
Peter Wilson (Australian rules footballer) (born 1963), Australian rules footballer
Peter Wilson (musician) (born 1980), Northern Irish musician
Peter Wilson (sport shooter) (born 1986), British sports shooter
Peter Wilson (record producer), UK record producer
Phil, Philip, Phill and Phillip Wilson (disambiguation) one of the following
Phil Wilson (trombonist) (born 1937), American jazz trombonist and educator
Phil Wilson (hurler) (born 1939), Irish sportsman
Phil Wilson (British politician) (born 1959), British Labour MP for Sedgefield
Phil Wilson (footballer, born 1960), English footballer
Phil Wilson (curler) (born 1965), Scottish curler
Phil Wilson (footballer, born 1972), English footballer
Philip Wilson (bishop) (1950-2021), Catholic archbishop of the Archdiocese of Adelaide, Australia
Philip D. Wilson Jr. (1920–2016), M.D., orthopedic surgeon 
Philip Whitwell Wilson (1875–1956), British Liberal politician, writer and journalist
Phill Wilson (born 1956), American HIV/AIDS activist
Phillip Wilson (drummer) (1941–1992), American jazz drummer
Pippa Wilson (born 1986), English professional sailor
Precious Wilson (born 1957), Jamaican soul singer
Preston Wilson (born 1974), American baseball player

Q
Quentin Wilson (1942–2019), American engineer
Quincy Wilson (running back) (born 1981), American football running back
Quincy Wilson (cornerback) (born 1996), American football cornerback

R
R. J. Wilson (born 1971), American politician
R. M. Wilson (born 1945), American mathematician
R. Paul Wilson, sleight of hand expert
Rab Wilson (born 1960), Scottish poet
Rachel Wilson (born 1977), Canadian actress
Rachel Wilson (neurobiologist), American neurobiologist
Rainn Wilson (born 1966), American actor
Ralph Wilson (1918–2014), American; founder and owner of the Buffalo Bills
Ramik Wilson (born 1992), American football linebacker
Ranji Wilson (1886–1953), New Zealand rugby union international
Ransom Wilson (born 1951), American flautist and conductor
Ray and Raymond Wilson (disambiguation), multiple people
Ray Wilson (English footballer) (1934–2018), member of the England team that won the 1966 World Cup
Ray Wilson (Australian rules footballer) (born 1945), Australian rules footballer
Ray Wilson (Scottish footballer) (born 1947), Scottish football full-back (West Bromwich Albion)
Ray Wilson (speedway rider) (born 1947), English speedway rider
Ray Wilson (musician) (born 1968), lead vocalist of Genesis
Ray Wilson (American football) (born 1971), US American footballer
Raymond Wilson (physicist) (1928–2018), English physicist who developed the concept of active optics
Reagan Wilson (born 1947), American model and actress
Rebecca Wilson (1961–2016), Australian journalist, radio and TV presenter
Rebekah Wilson (born 1991), British Olympic bobsledder
Rebel Wilson (born 1980), Australian comedian, actress and writer
Red Wilson (1929–2014), American baseball player
Reg Wilson (born 1948), English speedway team manager and rider
Reginald Wilson (psychologist) (1927-2020), American psychologist
Reinard Wilson (born 1973), American footballer
Renny Wilson, Canadian singer-songwriter and producer
Reno Wilson (born 1970), American actor, comedian and voice artist
Reuben Wilson (born 1935), American jazz organist
Rex Wilson (born 1960), New Zealand long-distance runner
Rich, Richard, Rick and Ricky Wilson (disambiguation), multiple people
Rich Wilson (journalist), contemporary UK based freelance rock writer
Richard Wilson (disambiguation), several people
Richard Wilson (painter) (1714–1782), Welsh landscape painter
Richard Wilson (Barnstaple MP) (c. 1750 – 1815), British politician; MP for Barnstaple, 1796–1802
Richard Wilson (Ipswich MP) (1759–1834), British politician; MP for Ipswich, 1806–1807
Richard Thornton Wilson, Jr. (1866–1929), American businessman and prominent figure in horse racing
Richard Wilson (Irish politician) (died 1957), Irish Farmers' Party politician, 1922–1936
Richard B. Wilson (1904–1991), mayor of Victoria, British Columbia, Canada, 1961–1965
Richard L. Wilson (1905–1981), American journalist
Richard Wilson (producer) (1915–1991), American film producer
Richard Wilson (author) (1920–1987), American science-fiction writer
Richard Wilson (physicist) (1926–2018), British-born American physicist
Richard G. Wilson (1931–1950), American soldier and Medal of Honor recipient
Richard Wilson (Scottish actor) (born 1936), British actor
Richard Guy Wilson (born 1940), architectural historian and University of Virginia faculty member
Richard Edward Wilson (born 1941), American composer
Richard Wilson, Baron Wilson of Dinton (born 1942), member of the British House of Lords and Cabinet Secretary
R. M. Wilson (born 1945), American mathematician (combinatorics), Professor at Caltech
Richard Wilson (scholar) (born 1950), British Shakespeare scholar
Richard Wilson (rugby player) (born 1953), New Zealand rugby union player
Richard Wilson (sculptor) (born 1953), British sculptor and musician
Richard Wilson (general) (born 1955), Australian general
Richard Wilson (footballer, born 1956), New Zealand football goalkeeper
Richard K. Wilson (born 1959), American professor of genetics and molecular microbiology
Richard Wilson (footballer, born 1960), English football player
Richard Wilson (Australian actor) (born 1984), British-born Australian actor
Richard F. Wilson, president of Illinois Wesleyan University
Richard Wilson (businessman) Australian businessman, notable managing director for Melbourne Victory
Rick Wilson (ice hockey) (born 1950), ice hockey player
Rick Wilson (racing driver) (born 1953), NASCAR driver
Rick Wilson (jockey) (born 1954), American jockey
Rick Wilson (basketball) (born 1956), basketball player
Rick Wilson (wrestler) (1965–1999), American wrestler best known as The Renegade
Rick Wilson (Australian politician) (born 1966), member of the Australian House of Representatives
Ricky Wilson (American musician) (1953–1985), guitarist of The B-52's
Ricky Wilson (basketball) (born 1964), American basketball player
Ricky Wilson (British musician) (born 1978), singer of Kaiser Chiefs
Rik Wilson (1962–2016), American ice hockey player
Risë Wilson, American community organizer
Rita Wilson (born 1956), American actress
Rob and Robert Wilson (disambiguation), multiple people
Rob Wilson (racing driver) (born 1952), racing driver and driver coach
Rob Wilson (born 1965), British politician and entrepreneur, MP for Reading East
 Rob Wilson (born 1973) known as Fresh I.E., Canadian rap artist
Robert Wilson (dramatist) (died 1600), English Elizabethan dramatist
Robert Wilson (British Army officer, born 1777) (1777–1849), British general and politician
Robert Wilson (Missouri politician) (1803–1870), American politician and U.S. Senator from Missouri
Robert Wilson (engineer) (1803–1882), Scottish engineer; inventor of the first practical screw propeller
Robert L. Wilson (politician) (1805–1880), American politician
Robert Wilson (ship captain) (1806–1888), helped escaped slaves to freedom
Robert Wilson (physician) (1829–1881), wrote on the conditions and practices in the British mining industry
Robert Wilson (merchant) (1832–1899), New Zealand merchant and company director
Robert Wilson (architect) (1834–1901), Scottish architect
Robert Patterson Clark Wilson (1834–1916), American politician, U.S. Representative from Missouri
Robert Wilson (priest, born 1840) (1840–1897), Warden of Keble College, Oxford
Robert Burns Wilson (1850–1916), American painter and poet
Robert Dick Wilson (1856–1930), American linguist and Presbyterian scholar
Robert Wilson (rugby union, born 1861) (1861–1944), rugby union player who represented New Zealand
Robert E. Lee Wilson (1865–1933), American cotton planter
Robert Wilson (rugby league) (1879–1916), rugby league footballer who played in the 1930s
Robert P. Wilson, American football player and coach
Robert Richard Wilson (1891–1969), farmer and politician in South Australia
Robert O. Wilson (1904–1967), American physician
Juice Wilson, Robert "Juice" Wilson (1904–1993), American jazz violinist
Robert O. Wilson (1906–1967), American physician noted for his humanitarian work during the Nanking Massacre
Robert Wilson (tenor) (1907–1964), Scottish tenor
Robert R. Wilson (1914–2000), American physicist
Robert Nichol Wilson, Northern Irish politician
Robert L. Wilson (1920–1944), United States Marine and Medal of Honor recipient
Robert Wilson (astronomer) (1927–2002), British astronomer
Robert W. Wilson (philanthropist) (1927–2013), American multimillionaire philanthropist
Robert Anton Wilson (1932–2007), American author, essayist, occult and science fiction writer
Robert Wilson (Manitoba politician) (born 1934), Canadian politician
Robert Wilson (Canadian rower) (born 1935), Canadian Olympic rower
Robert Wilson (tennis) (1935–2020), tennis player from the 1960s
Robert Woodrow Wilson (born 1936), American astronomer and 1978 Nobel laureate in physics
Robert B. Wilson (born 1937), American economist and professor at Stanford University
Robert Wilson (director) (born 1941), American avant-garde stage director and playwright
Robert C. Wilson (born 1951), American novelist and lawyer
Robert Charles Wilson (born 1953), Canadian science fiction writer
Robert Wilson (crime novelist) (born 1957), British crime novelist
Robert Arnott Wilson (born 1958), British mathematician
Robert Wilson (footballer, born 1961), English football player for Fulham
Robert McLiam Wilson (born 1966), Northern Irish novelist
Robert Wilson (running back) (born 1969), American football player
Robert Wilson (wide receiver) (1974–2020), American football player
Robert Scott Wilson (born 1987), American model and actor
R. N. D. Wilson (1899–1953), Irish poet
Robin Wilson (author) (1928–2013), science fiction author
Robin Wilson (disambiguation), several people
Robin Wilson (mathematician) (born 1943), head of pure mathematics at the Open University, UK
Robin Wilson (field hockey) (born 1957), New Zealand field hockey player
Robin Wilson (musician) (born 1965), American singer and guitarist, lead vocalist of the Gin Blossoms
Robin Wilson (eco-designer) (born 1969), eco-friendly lifestyle expert
Robin Wilson (psychologist), Canadian-American psychologist
Robley Wilson (1930–2018), American poet, writer and editor
Rod Wilson (born 1981), US American footballer
Roger Wilson (disambiguation), several people
Roger Wilson (Indian Army officer) (1882–1966), British Indian Army general
Roger Wilson (bishop) (1905–2002), Bishop of Wakefield and of Chichester
Roger C. Wilson (1912–1988), composer of church music
Roger Wilson (ice hockey) (born 1946), Canadian/American professional ice hockey player
Roger B. Wilson (born 1948), American Democratic politician, Governor of Missouri
Sophie Wilson aka Roger Wilson (born 1957), English computer scientist
Roger Wilson (actor) (born 1958), American movie and TV actor
Roger Wilson (folk musician), British folk musician
Roger Wilson (rugby union) (born 1981), Irish rugby player
Roland Wilson (barrister) (1840–1919), British writer on law and India
Roland Wilson (economist) (1904–1996), Australian economist
Roland Wilson (conductor) (born 1956), British conductor and player of baroque cornet, in Germany
 Roma Wilson, known as Elder Roma Wilson (1910–2018), American gospel harmonica player and singer 
Romer Wilson (1891–1930), British novelist and biographer
Ron and Ronald Wilson (disambiguation), multiple people
Ron Wilson (Australian footballer) (1915–1984), Australian footballer
Ron Wilson (footballer, born 1924) (1924–2007), English footballer with West Ham United
Ron Wilson (footballer, born 1941), Scottish footballer with Port Vale
Ron Wilson (American politician) (born 1943), leader of Sons of Confederate Veterans
Ron Wilson (drummer) (1945–1989), American musician
Ron Wilson (newsreader) (born 1952), Irish-born Australian television newsreader
Ron Wilson (ice hockey b. 1955), Canadian NHL coach and player
Ron Wilson (ice hockey b. 1956), Canadian AHL assistant coach and NHL player
Ron Wilson (Australian politician) (born 1958), Victorian MP
Ron Wilson (CBC radio host) (born 1958), Canadian radio host, host of CBC's Edmonton A.M.
Ron Wilson (Clear Channel radio host), American host of the radio program In the Garden with Ron Wilson
Ron Wilson (comics), comic book artist
Ronald Wilson (1922–2005), Australian lawyer, judge and activist
Ronell Wilson (born 1982), American gang leader sentenced to death for the murder of two police officers
Ross Wilson (disambiguation), several people
Ross Wilson (ice hockey) (1919–2002), Canadian ice hockey player
Ross Wilson (musician) (born 1947), Australian musician, songwriter, and singer
Ross Wilson (ambassador) (born 1955), U.S. diplomat and ambassador
Ross Wilson (artist) (born 1958), Irish artist and sculptor
Ross Wilson (table tennis) (born 1995), British paralympic table tennis player
Roxane Wilson (born 1965), Australian actress
Roxanne Wilson (born 1979), American TV and radio personality
Roy Wilson (British politician) (1876–1942), British Member of Parliament
Roy Wilson (baseball) (1896–1969), American Major League Baseball player
Roy Wilson (Canadian politician) (born 1932), Canadian provincial politician
Russell Wilson (disambiguation), several people
Russell Wilson (Canadian politician) (1864–1936), mayor of Saskatoon, Saskatchewan, Canada
Russell Wilson (cricketer) (born 1959), English cricketer
Russell Wilson (born 1988), US American football quarterback
Ruth Wilson (actress) (born 1982), English actress
Ruth Wilson Epstein, alleged Soviet spy
Ryan Wilson (disambiguation), several people
Ryan Wilson (athlete) (born 1980), American hurdler
Ryan Wilson (ice hockey) (born 1987), Canadian ice hockey player
Ryan Wilson (rugby union) (born 1989), Scottish rugby union player
Ryan Wilson (wrestler), American wrestler

S
S. Clay Wilson (1941–2021), American cartoonist
S. S. Wilson, American screenwriter
Sally-Ann Wilson (born 1959), British media executive
Sam, Sammy and Samuel Wilson (disambiguation), multiple people
Sammy Wilson (footballer, born 1931) (1931–2014), Scottish footballer
Sammy Wilson (born 1953), Northern Irish Democratic Unionist politician
Samuel Wilson (1766–1854), American meat-packer associated with being the original Uncle Sam
Samuel Wilson (footballer) (born 1983),  Nicaraguan footballer
Samuel Wilson (pastoralist) (1832–1895), Irish-Australian pastoralist and politician
Samuel Alexander Kinnier Wilson (1878–1937), British neurologist who first described Wilson's disease
Samuel B. Wilson (1873–1954), American lawyer and judge from Minnesota
Samuel Davis Wilson (1881–1939), American mayor of Philadelphia
Samuel Franklin Wilson (1845–1923), American state politician and judge
Samuel Grayson Wilson (born 1949), U.S. federal judge
Samuel Herbert Wilson (1873–1950), British colonial governor
Samuel J. Wilson (1828–1883), Presbyterian academic and pastor
Samuel Rupert Wilson (1844–1927), mining engineer in Australia
Samuel V. Wilson (1923–2017), United States Army, director DIA and intelligence officer
Sandin Wilson (born 1959), American bassist and singer
Sandy Wilson (1924–2014), English composer
Sandy Wilson (director) (born 1947), Canadian film director and screenwriter
Sandy Fife Wilson (born 1950), Native American art educator, fashion designer and artist
Sarah Wilson (disambiguation), one of the following
Sarah Wilson (impostor) (1754?-?), English impostor of the non-existent sister of Queen Charlotte
Sarah Wilson (war correspondent) (1865–1929), first woman war correspondent and aunt of Winston Churchill
Sarah L. Wilson (born 1959), judge of the United States Court of Federal Claims
Sarah Wilson (dog trainer) (born 1960), American author and dog trainer
Sarah Wilson (journalist) (born 1974), Australian journalist and TV presenter
Sarah Wilson (art historian), British art historian
Scott Wilson (disambiguation), multiple people
Scott Barchard Wilson (1865–1923), ornithologist and bird collector
Scott Wilson (judge) (1870–1942), judge on the United States Court of Appeals for the First Circuit
Scott Wilson (actor) (1942–2018), American actor
Scott Wilson (bodybuilder) (1950–2018), American bodybuilder
Scott Wilson (academic) (born 1962), scholar in media and cultural theory
Scott Wilson (composer) (born 1969), Canadian composer
Scott Wilson (rugby league born 1970), Australian professional rugby league footballer
Scott Wilson (footballer, born 1977), Scottish football player
Scott Wilson (footballer, born 1982), Scottish football player (Airdrie, Clyde, Stranraer)
Scott Wilson (ice hockey) (born 1992), Canadian ice hockey player
Scott Wilson (1980s rugby league), rugby league footballer
Sean Wilson (actor) (born 1965), English television actor
Sean Wilson (speedway rider) (born 1969), English international speedway rider
Sean Michael Wilson, Scottish comic book writer
Serena Wilson (1933–2007), American belly dancer and TV presenter
Seretta Wilson (born 1951), British actress
Seth Wilson (1914–2006), American educator
Shadow Wilson (1919–1959), American jazz drummer
Shane Wilson (racing) (born 1968), American NASCAR crew chief
Shane Wilson, Canadian sculptor
Shannon Wilson, Canadian fashion designer
Shaun Wilson (born 1972), Australian artist and film maker
Shaun Wilson (American football) (born 1995), American football player
Sheddrick Wilson (born 1973), American football wide receiver
Shelby Wilson (born 1937), American Olympic wrestler
Sheree J. Wilson (born 1958), American actress
Sheri-D Wilson, Canadian poet and activist
Sherry Wilson, Canadian politician in New Brunswick
Shirley Wilson (1925–2021), US American football coach
Sid Wilson (born 1977), turntablist of Slipknot
Simon Wilson (disambiguation), several people
Simon Wilson (fencer) (born 1958), Paralympic fencer and Team GB coach at the 2012 Summer Paralympics
Simon Wilson (ice hockey) (born 1976), New Zealand ice hockey player and coach
Simon Wilson (cyclist) (born 1980), in 2011 British National Track Championships
Simon Wilson (hurler), Irish hurler
Simon Wilson (equestrian) in FEI World Cup Jumping 2008/2009
Sir Mawn Wilson (born 1973), American football wide receiver
Skip Wilson, American college baseball coach
Smokey Wilson (1936–2015), American blues guitarist
Sophie Wilson (born 1957), English computer scientist
Spanky Wilson, American soul, funk, and jazz singer
Staci Wilson (born 1976), American Olympic soccer player
Stacy Wilson (born 1965), Canadian ice hockey player
Stan and Stanley Wilson (disambiguation), several people
Stan Wilson (footballer, born 1912) (1912–2004), Australian rules footballer for Essendon
Stan Wilson (footballer, born 1928) (1928–2002), Australian rules footballer for Richmond
Stanley C. Wilson (1879–1967), American politician
Stanley Wilson (musician) (1917–1970), American musician and composer
Stanley Wilson (running back) (born 1961), American football running back
Stanley Wilson (cornerback) (born 1982), American football cornerback
Stefan Wilson (born 1989), British racing driver
Stephanie Wilson (born 1966), American engineer and astronaut
Stephen, Steve and Steven Wilson (disambiguation), multiple people
Stephen Fowler Wilson (1821–1897), U.S. Representative from Pennsylvania
Stephen Victor Wilson (born 1941), U.S. federal judge
Stephen John Wilson (born 1948), Australian politician from Tasmania
Stephen Wilson (athlete) (born 1971), Australian track and field athlete
Stephen W. Wilson, United States Air Force Lieutenant General
Steve Wilson (offensive lineman) (born 1954), American NFL player for the Tampa Bay Buccaneers
Steve Wilson (defensive back) (born 1957), American NFL player for the Denver Broncos
Steve Wilson (jazz musician) (born 1961), American jazz saxophonist & flautist
Steve Wilson (baseball) (born 1964), Canadian baseball player
Steve Wilson (football commentator) (born 1967), British Match of the Day commentator
Steve Wilson (footballer) (born 1974), English goalkeeper
Steve Wilson (presenter) (born 1974), English television presenter
Steve Wilson (director), American television director
Steve Wilson (reporter), American investigative reporter
Steve Wilson (drummer), drummer for Against All Will
Steven Wilson (born 1967), English musician of Porcupine Tree
Steven Wilson (baseball) (born 1994), American baseball player
Stewart Wilson (born 1942), Scottish rugby union player
Stewart Murray Wilson (1946–2021), New Zealand sex offender
Stu and Stuart Wilson (disambiguation), several people
Stu Wilson (American football) (1907–1963), American football player
Stu Wilson (born 1954), New Zealand rugby union player
Stuart Wilson (actor) (born 1946), English actor
Stuart Wilson (footballer) (born 1977), English football midfielder
Stuart Wilson (archaeologist) (born 1979), English archaeologist
Stuart Wilson (Big Brother) (born 1984), contestant in Big Brother UK
Stuart Wilson (sound engineer), Academy Award nominated sound engineer
Sue and Susan Wilson (disambiguation), several people
Sue Wilson, American politician in Wyoming
Susan Wilson (born 1951), American author
Susan R. Wilson (1948–2020), Australian statistician
Sydney Wilson (born 1990), English snooker player

T
T. J. Wilson (boxer) (born 1975), American boxer
Tack Wilson (born 1955), American baseball player
Talei Qalo Wilson (born 1995), Fijian rugby union player
Tammie Wilson (born 1961), American politician in Alaska
Tammy Wilson (born 1973), New Zealand rugby union player
Tanya Wilson (born 1950), Hawaiian beauty queen (Miss USA)
Tara Lynn Wilson (born 1982), Canadian actress
Tara Wilson (pageant titleholder), Miss West Virginia USA
Tavon Wilson (born 1990), American football safety
Tay Wilson (1925–2014), New Zealand rower and Olympic official
Taylor Wilson (born 1994), American nuclear scientist
Ted Wilson (footballer) (1855–?), footballer who played for Stoke
Ted Wilson (mayor) (born 1939), mayor of Salt Lake City
Ted N. C. Wilson (born 1950), president of the Adventist World Church
Ted Wilson (American football) (born 1964), American football wide receiver
Teddy Wilson (1912–1986), American jazz pianist
Teddy Wilson (television personality), TV personality and producer
Teresa Wilson, American softball coach
 Terence Wilson, also known as Astro, former British singer and member of British bandUB40
Terry Wilson (disambiguation), several people
Terry Wilson (actor) (1923–1999), American actor
Terry Wilson (Canadian football) (born 1942), Canadian footballer
Terry Wilson (footballer, born 1959), Scottish footballer (Hibernian FC, Dunfermline Athletic FC)
Terry Wilson (footballer, born 1969), Scottish footballer (Nottingham Forest FC)
Terry Wilson (musician), American musician
Tex Wilson (1901–1946), American baseball player
Theo Wilson (1917–1997), American journalist
Theodore Wilson (1943–1991), American character actor
 Theodore James Wilson, better known under his stage name Tyson Kidd (born 1980), Canadian professional wrestler
Theodore Percival Wilson (1819–1881), Anglican priest and headmaster in Adelaide, South Australia
Thom Wilson, American; punk rock record producer and engineer
Thomas Wilson (disambiguation), multiple people
Thomas Wilson (rhetorician) (1524–1581), English diplomat, judge, and privy councillor
Thomas Wilson (Dean of Worcester) (died 1586)
 Sir Thomas Wilson (record keeper) (1560?–1629), English official and Member of Parliament
Thomas Wilson (lexicographer) (1563–1622), English priest, compiler of an early biblical reference work
Thomas Wilson (bishop) (1663–1755), Bishop of Sodor and Man
Thomas Spencer Wilson (1727–1798), British Army officer and Member of Parliament
Thomas Wilson (philanthropist) (1764–1843), English Congregationalist benefactor
Thomas Wilson (Virginia politician) (1765–1826), U.S. Representative from Virginia
Thomas Wilson (Pennsylvania) (1772–1824), U.S. Representative from Pennsylvania
Thomas Wilson (poet) (1773–1858), Tyneside poet, writer of The Pitman's Pay
Thomas Wilson (mayor) (1787–1863), mayor of Adelaide, Australia
Thomas Braidwood Wilson (1792–1843), Scottish explorer, medical practitioner and settler
Thomas Wilson (shipping magnate) (1792–1869), English shipping magnate
Thomas Bellerby Wilson (1807–1865), American naturalist
Thomas Stokeley Wilson (1813–1894), judge in Iowa
Thomas Wilson (industrialist), Scottish–American business magnate
Thomas Wilson (Minnesota) (1827–1910), U.S. Representative from Minnesota
Thomas Wilson (cricketer, born 1841) (1841–1929)
Thomas Wilson (New Zealand cricketer) (1869–1918)
Thomas B. Wilson (1852–1929), New York state senator
 Thomas Woodrow Wilson (1856–1924), 28th president of the United States
Thomas Fleming Wilson (1862–1929), British Member of Parliament for North East Lanarkshire, 1910–1911
Thomas E. Wilson (1868–1958), founder of Wilson Sporting Goods and the Wilson & Company meatpacking company
Thomas Wilson (Archdeacon of Worcester) (1882–1961)
T. Webber Wilson (Thomas Webber Wilson, 1893–1948), U.S. Representative from Mississippi
Thomas Wilson (composer) (1927–2001), Scottish composer
Thomas D. Wilson (born 1935), information scientist researching information-seeking behaviors
Thomas R. Wilson (born 1946), director of the Defense Intelligence Agency
Bubba Wilson Thomas "Bubba" Wilson (born 1955), American professional basketball player
Thomas J. Wilson (born c. 1958), CEO Allstate
Thomas F. Wilson (born 1959), American actor
Tim and Timothy Wilson (disambiguation), several people
Tim Wilson (American football) (1954–1996), American football running back
Tim Wilson (comedian) (1961–2014), American comedian and country music artist
Tim Wilson (UK politician) (born 1961), British animator and UKIP member
Tim Wilson (Australian politician) (born 1980), Australian politician and commentator
Tim Wilson (broadcaster), New Zealand television news reporter and anchor
Tim Wilson (filmmaker), American filmmaker known as "Black Magic Tim"
Tim Wilson (canoeist), Australian canoeist
Timothy Wilson, American psychologist
Todd Wilson (director) (1963–2005), American film director
Todd Wilson (skier) (born 1965), American Olympic Nordic combined skier
Todd Wilson (organist), American musician
Tom and Tommy Wilson (disambiguation), multiple people
Tom Wilson (actor) (1880–1965), American actor
Tom Wilson (1910s catcher) (1890–1953), Major League Baseball catcher
Tom Wilson (footballer, born 1896) (1896–1948), England and Huddersfield Town footballer
Tom Wilson (footballer, born 1902) (1902–1992), English footballer
Tom Wilson (footballer, born 1930) (1930–2010), English footballer
Tom Wilson (record producer) (1931–1978), 1960s music producer
Tom Wilson (cartoonist) (1931–2011), US cartoonist, creator of Ziggy
Tom Wilson (American football) (1944–2016), Texas A&M University head football coach
Tom Wilson (DJ) (1952–2004), Scottish radio/club DJ
Tom Wilson (musician) (born 1959), of the band Junkhouse
Tom Wilson (New Jersey lobbyist) (born 1967), chairman of the New Jersey Republican State Committee
Tom Wilson (2000s catcher) (born 1970), Major League Baseball catcher
Tom Wilson (ice hockey) (born 1994), Canadian ice hockey player
Tommy Wilson (footballer, born 1877) (1877–1940), English footballer
Tommy Wilson (footballer, born 1930) (1930–1992), Nottingham Forest and Walsall footballer
Tommy Wilson (American football) (1932–2006), National Football League running back
Tommy Wilson (umpire) (born 1937), English cricket umpire
Tommy Wilson (footballer, born 1961), head coach of Scotland U-19 national team, as of 2006
Tony Wilson (British Army officer) (1935–2019), Brigadier during the Falklands Conflict
Tony Wilson (1950–2007), English radio and TV presenter
Tony Wilson (radio presenter), Australian author and radio presenter
Tony Wilson (snooker player) (born 1964), Manx snooker player
Torrie Wilson (born 1975), female professional wrestler
Toyelle Wilson (born 1981), American basketball player and coach
Tracey Scott Wilson, American playwright and television writer
Tracy Wilson (born 1961), Canadian ice dancer
Tracy Wilson (American football) (born 1989), American football safety
Travis Wilson (softball) (born 1977), New Zealand softball and baseball player
Travis Wilson (wide receiver) (born 1984), National Football League player
Trevor Wilson (baseball) (born 1966), American baseball player
Trevor Wilson (basketball) (born 1968), American basketball player
Trey Wilson (1948–1989), American character actor
Troy Wilson (defensive lineman) (born 1970), US American footballer
Troy Wilson (Australian rules footballer) (born 1972), Australian speedway driver and Australian rules footballer
Tug Wilson (baseball) (1860–1914), American baseball player
Tug Wilson (footballer) (Thomas Harold "Tom" Wilson, 1917–1959), Gillingham F.C. player of the 1930s and 1940s
Tyler Wilson (American football) (born 1989), American football player
Tyler Wilson (baseball) (born 1989), American baseball player
Tyler Wilson (footballer) (born 1989), US-born Puerto Rican footballer (soccer)
Tyree Wilson (born 2002), American football player

U
Ulrica Wilson, African-American mathematician
Ulrich Wilson (born 1964), Dutch footballer
U.P. Wilson (1934–2004), American blues guitarist and singer

V
Valarie Wilson, American politician in Georgia
Valerie Plame Wilson (born 1963), CIA operative and figure in political scandal
Vance Wilson (born 1973), American baseball player
Vaughn Wilson (born 1976), American actor
Vic Wilson (cricketer) (1921–2008), English cricketer
Vic Wilson (racing driver) (1931–2001), British racing driver
Vicki Wilson (born 1965), Australian netball international and coach
Victor Wilson (1877–1957), Australian politician
Victoria Wilson (born 1949), American publishing executive
Viola Wilson (1911–2002), Scottish soprano in Australia

W
W. Brett Wilson (born 1957), Canadian entrepreneur and Dragon's Den dragon
W. Eugene Wilson (1929–2015), American politician in North Carolina
Waddell Wilson (born 1936), American NASCAR crew chief and engine builder
Wade Wilson (American football) (1959–2019), US American footballer and coach
Wally Wilson (born 1947), American record producer and songwriter
Walter Wilson (biographer) (1781?–1847), English biographer of nonconformism
Walter Horatio Wilson (1839–1902), lawyer and politician in the Legislative Assembly of Queensland
Walter Wilson (footballer, fl. 1894) British 19th-century footballer
Walter Bartley Wilson (1870–1954), artist; founder and football manager at Cardiff City
Walter Gordon Wilson (1874–1957), engineer and member of the British Royal Naval Air Service
Walter Wilson (sport wrestler) (1884–?), British Olympic wrestler
Walter K. Wilson, Jr. (1906–1985), American soldier
Walter Wilson (baseball) (1913–1994), pitcher in Major League Baseball
Wayne Wilson (American football) (born 1957), US American footballer and coach
Wayne Wilson (ice hockey) (born 1961), Canadian ice hockey player and coach
Welcome W. Wilson, Sr. (born 1928), American public servant and businessman
Welcome W. Wilson, Jr. (born 1951), American businessman
Wendy Wilson (born 1969), American singer (Wilson Phillips); daughter of Brian Wilson (The Beach Boys)
Wes Wilson (1937–2020), American artist
Wesley Wilson (1893–1958), American blues and jazz singer-songwriter
William Wilson (disambiguation), including Will, William and Willie Wilson
 Will Wilson
Will Wilson (1912–2005), American politician
Will Wilson (photographer) (born 1969), Native American photographer
 William Wilson
William Wilson (died 1582), British politician; MP for Southwark
William Wilson (priest) (1545–1615), Canon of Windsor
William Wilson (architect) (1641–1710), English architect, builder and sculptor
William Wilson (1720–1796), British politician; Member of Parliament for Ilchester, 1761–1768
William (Amos) Wilson (1762–1821), folklore figure of southeastern and south-central Pennsylvania
William Wilson (Ohio politician) (1773–1827), U.S. Representative from Ohio
William Wilson (Pennsylvania politician), U.S. Representative from Pennsylvania, 1815–1819
William Wilson (Upper Canada politician) (1789–1847), politician in Upper Canada
William Carus Wilson (1791–1859), English churchman and founder and editor of The Children's Friend
William Wilson (botanist) (1799–1871), English botanist
William Wilson (poet) (1801–1860), Scottish-American poet, bookseller and publisher
William Wilson (bishop) (1806–1888), Anglican bishop in Scotland
William Wilson (engineer) (1809–1862), first locomotive driver in Germany, railway pioneer
William James Erasmus Wilson (1809–1884), English physician and surgeon
William Sydney Wilson (1816–1862), prominent Confederate politician
William K. Wilson (1817–1898), Wisconsin State Senator
William Wilson (mayor) (1819–1897), first mayor of Christchurch, New Zealand, 1868
William Tecumseh Wilson (1823–1905), American Union brevet brigadier general from Ohio
William Wilson (Zouave) (1823–1874), American Union brevet brigadier general from New York
William Wilson (Wisconsin politician), Wisconsin State Senator
William Wilson (Victorian politician) (1834–1891), in Victoria
William Wilson (Donegal MP) (1836–1876), MP for Donegal 1876–1879
William Wilson (British Columbia politician) (1838–1922), merchant and politician in British Columbia
 Sir William Deane Wilson (1843–1921), British army surgeon-general
William Lyne Wilson (1843–1900), United States Postmaster General
William Wilson (aquatics) (1844–1912), Scottish writer on swimming, and the inventor of water polo
William Wilson (New Brunswick politician) (1845–1921), Canadian politician in New Brunswick
William Wilson (Medal of Honor) (1847–1895), one of only 19 individuals to receive the Medal of Honor twice
William Edward Wilson (astronomer) (1851–1908), Irish astronomer
William Tyson Wilson (1855–1921), British trade unionist and Member of Parliament for Westhoughton
William C. Wilson (New York politician), New York comptroller in 1906
William Bauchop Wilson (1862–1934), US (Scottish-born) labor leader and political figure
William C. Wilson (minister) (1866–1915), General Superintendent of the Church of the Nazarene
William Lyall Wilson (1866–1914), minister of the Church of Scotland
William Othello Wilson (1867–1928), member of the US Army's 9th Cavalry, and recipient of the Medal of Honor
William Warfield Wilson (1868–1942), U.S. Representative from Illinois
William E. Wilson (Indiana politician) (1870–1948), U.S. Representative from Indiana
William Wilson (English academic) (1875–1965), British physicist
William Wallace Wilson (1876–1967), Alberta politician
William H. Wilson (1877–1937), U.S. Representative from Pennsylvania, 1935–1937
William Wilson (defender), English footballer for Newcastle United and Bradford City
William Hardy Wilson (1881–1955), Australian architect, artist and author
William Wilber Wilfred Wilson (1885–1964), Canadian politician
William Wilson (physicist) (1887–1948), English-born physicist
William Wilson (footballer, born 1902), English footballer
William Llewellyn Wilson, American conductor, musician, teacher and music educator from Baltimore
William Wilson (artist) (1905–1972), Scottish stained glass artist, printmaker and watercolour painter
William E. Wilson (writer) (1906–1988), American author and professor
William Wilson (Australian sportsman) (1909–1976), Australian cricketer and Australian rules footballer
William Wilson (Labour politician) (1913–2010), British Labour Member of Parliament, 1964–1983
William A. Wilson (diplomat) (1914–2009), first U.S. Ambassador to the Holy See
William A. Wilson (folklorist) (1933–2016), expert in Mormon folklore
William Wilson (footballer, born 1915), English footballer
William Wilson (footballer, born November 1915), English footballer
William George Wilson (1917–2007), sports cinematographer
William Proctor Wilson (1921–2010), president of Butterick Publishing Company
William Wilson (footballer, born 1921), Scottish football goalkeeper
W. Eugene Wilson (1929–2015), Republican member of the North Carolina General Assembly
William Julius Wilson (born 1935), American sociologist
 William Robert Wilson, known as W. R. Wilson (c. 1849–1900), Australian mining businessman and racehorse owner
William Scott Wilson (born 1944), American author and translator of samurai literature
 Willie Wilson
Willie Wilson (footballer, born 1894) (1894–1956), Scottish footballer (Hearts) 
Willie Wilson (footballer, born 1941) (1941–2001), Scottish footballer (Hibs)
Willie Wilson (footballer, born 1972), Scottish footballer (Dumbarton) 
Willie Wilson (baseball) (born 1955), American baseball outfielder
Willis Wilson (born 1960), American basketball coach
Willy Wilson (baseball) (1884–1925), American baseball player
Willy Wilson (born 1980), Filipino basketball player
Wilmer Wilson IV (born 1989), American artist
Woodrow Wilson (1856–1924), 28th president of the United States (1913–21)
Woodie Wilson (1925–1994), American racing driver

Y
Yvette Wilson (1964–2012), American comedian and actress
Yvonne S. Wilson (1929–2019), American politician

Z
Zach Wilson (born 1999), American football player
Zuleica Wilson (born 1993), Angolan model

Fictional characters
 Brad Wilson, a character in the 1983 superhero movie Superman III
 Carrie and Trevor/Bobby Wilson, characters from Netflix's Julie and the Phantoms
 David "Pudd'nhead" Wilson, title character of Pudd'nhead Wilson novel by Mark Twain
Debbie Wilson, character on the TV series 90210
Dennis the Menace The Wilsons, Mr. George and Mrs. Martha Wilson (and 7 of their descendants) in US "Dennis the Menace" comics and various media
Doug Wilson (Weeds character), fictional character in the television series Weeds
Dr. (James) Wilson in House, M.D. television drama
 Goldie Wilson and Goldie Wilson III, characters from the movies Back to the Future and Back to the Future Part II
 Jade Wilson from the Teen Titans Go! To the Movies film
 Kip Wilson, one of the two main characters in the American television sitcom Bosom Buddies played by Tom Hanks
 Liz Wilson, veterinarian and girlfriend of Jon Arbuckle in the Garfield comic strip and related media
Norman Wilson (The Wire), fictional character on the television drama The Wire
Matt Wilson (Home and Away), fictional character in the Australian soap opera
 Sam "Snap" Wilson, fictional Marvel Comics superhero known as the Falcon
 Rodney Wilson, a character in the 2012 American comedy movie Wanderlust
Sergeant Arthur Wilson in television comedy Dad's Army
 Slade Wilson, fictional DC Comics supervillain known as Deathstroke
 Scotty Wilson, a recurring character in the American fantasy drama television series Highway to Heaven
 Wade Winston Wilson, mercenary and anti-hero "Deadpool" in Marvel Comics
 William Wilson, title character of William Wilson (short story) by Edgar Allan Poe
Wilson (Home Improvement) Wilson W. Wilson Jr. in Home Improvement television comedy series

See also
Wilson's disease, autosomal recessive genetic disorder
Wilson's Heart, episode in season four of House
Wilson's Heart, a virtual reality video game
Wilson's Raid, cavalry operation during the American Civil War
Wilson's snipe, Gallinago delicata
Wilson's warbler, Cardellina pusilla
Del Wilson Trophy, Western Hockey League goaltending trophy
, guided missile armed destroyer, named for Admiral Henry Braid Wilson
Malcolm Wilson Bridge, bridge in New York City, also known as the Tappan Zee Bridge
Mary Wilson (album), 1979 album by Mary Wilson
Matt Wilson (crater), elliptical crater in the Northern Territory, Australia
Scott Wilson Group, UK-based civil engineering consultancy
SS Wilson (1968), steam-powered cargo ship
SS Thomas Wilson, American whaleback freighter wrecked in Lake Superior in 1902

Lists of people by surname